The following is a list of characters that appear in Young Justice.

Note for reading: The designations for the characters are used when the zeta beams beam them from one place to another, and are normally spoken in episode by an automated voice (recorded by Stephanie Lemelin). Numbers without a letter represent members of the Justice League, A rank represents individuals authorized to use the zeta beams, B rank represents members of the Team, C rank represents the Team's pets, D rank represents members of the Outsiders, E rank represents the reserve members of the Justice League, G rank represents the individuals added to a splinter Team assembled by Nightwing, Z rank represents members of Batman, Incorporated, and L represents Light members.

Overview

Main characters

"The Team"

Founding Members
The initial six main characters were chosen by the producers, from a list of potential candidates of 50 to 60 DC Comics teenage superheroes. The criteria consisted of age, powers, personality, cultural icon status, and dynamics. An additional regular, Zatanna, was introduced partway through the first season, and Rocket was added at the end of the first season.

 Nightwing / Robin I / Dick Grayson (voiced by Jesse McCartney) - Designation: B01. Known as Robin throughout Season 1; Grayson was, though only thirteen, the most experienced member of the team. He does not possess any superpowers, however, he is an excellent hand-to-hand combatant, tactician, and a technological genius. He has a flippant personality, and can be heard laughing in combat or when sneaking up on villains to unnerve and startle them. He repeatedly plays with the English language, particularly with words which cease to function without prefixes, such as "disaster" ("aster"), "overwhelmed" ("whelmed"), and "distraught" ("traught"). Batman had forbidden Robin from revealing his secret identity to the team, though Kid Flash was aware of it. Robin acts as team leader when Aqualad is unable to. Aqualad sees Robin as reluctant to lead the team, feeling that he doesn't know enough. "Eventually he shows that he is a natural born leader. And that's just part of what you'll see from Dick Grayson". In Season 2 (set five years later in the future), Dick has assumed the identity of Nightwing while Tim Drake has assumed the mantle of Robin. Nightwing has become leader of the team, assigning and participating in missions. Dick is revealed to apart of the top secret deep cover mission alongside Aqualad who acts as a mole to infiltrate the Light with only Wally and Artemis aware of the truth, but gradually begins to realize how his secrecy and reckless decisions endangered the lives of his friends and teammates who become further involved. After "Endgame", Dick decides to take a leave of absence after Wally's sacrifice and leaves Barbara in charge if they need any help. Between Seasons 2 and 3, he's become leader of his own team alongside Oracle; later recruiting Tigress, Superboy, and Black Lightning, but is also secretly a member of the Anti-Light to use the Light's methods against them alongside Batman and the Justice League and Team leaders. During the season, Dick still has trouble moving on following Wally's death, but later manages to finally come to terms and accept his loss and later rejoins the Team. In Season 4, Dick and the original Team re-open the investigation into Superboy's death and finally discovers he is still alive, is trapped inside the Phantom Zone as well as the conspiracy surrounding his disappearance and are now working to find a way rescue him. He later moves to intercept General Zod and his forces at the Fortress of Solitude, only to have an ice structure brought down his head, and stopping his heart, apparently killing him, but actually faked his demise by slowing his heartbeat and faking a cut. He reunites with the heroes and altogether, they defeat the Kryptonians in Metropolis and finally succeed in saving Superboy.
 Aquaman II / Aqualad / Kaldur'ahm (voiced by Khary Payton) – Designation: B02; later 27. In Season 1, Kaldur'ahm (or "Kaldur" for short) was the sixteen-year-old leader of the team. His powers, channeled through the tattoos on his arms, are a mixture of Atlantean sorcery and science. He displays super strength, durability, as well as the ability to breathe and speak underwater, typical of Atlanteans. He also possesses the ability to form hard water constructs through the use of his Atlantean water bearers and to generate electricity. He was selected as the initial leader for the Team, but stated that he did not want to remain leader and wished to turn over leadership to Robin when he was ready, saying that it was his destiny to lead this team. In Season 2 (set five years later), Aqualad is Nightwing's mole in his father Black Manta's organization to infiltrate the Light and discover who their partner is. His "defection" is based upon his being the son of Black Manta (which Aquaman covered up) as well as the death of Tula. When Miss Martian fights Aqualad later, her psychic abilities caused her to learn about Aqualad and Tigress' true mission with the psychic attack leaving Aqualad in a catatonic state. To cure his son (thanks to Tigress' suggestion), Deathstroke and Tigress capture Miss Martian who manage to restore his mind. During the Summit, he and Tigress were revealed to be the spies and after their mission is complete, Aqualad returns to his post as leader once again. By Season 3, Kaldur has become Aquaman II and is co-leader of the Justice League along with Wonder Woman. Kaldur is secretly a member of the Anti-Light, consisting of Batman, Wonder Woman, Nightwing, Miss Martian, Oracle and Robin as they plan to use the Light's methods against them which they keep secret from the rest of the League and Team. However, by the end of the season, following the Anti-Light's exposure, both Kaldur and Wonder Woman willingly step down and appoint Black Lightning as the Justice League's newest leader. In Season 4, Kaldur has trouble coping with Conner's death and tries to distract himself by focusing on the current problems in Altantis from rising issues between the cities, stopping Ocean Master and locating Arion's lost crown. By the end of his arc, Kaldur decides to take a leave of absence from the Justice League and will now be sharing the mantle of Aquaman alongside his returning mentor Orin and fellow former protege Lagoon Boy. After returning from his sabbatical, Kaldur learns of Superboy's survival and works with the Team to save him from the Phantom Zone and defeat the House of Zod. In the aftermath, Kaldur and League decide to parole the captive Kryptonians on Trombus.
 Kid Flash I / Wally West (voiced by Jason Spisak) – Designation: B03. During Season 1, Kid Flash is the team's fifteen-year-old speedster. He has enhanced speed, although he has not fully mastered his abilities, often falling down while running at high speeds due to a misstep. Kid Flash cannot vibrate his molecules through solid objects like the Flash and gets a bloody nose if he attempts to. He is a flirt, beginning with M'gann and extending to any woman he comes into contact with. Originally, Kid Flash has a rocky relationship with Artemis, constantly fighting and bickering, but slowly grows throughout the first season, eventually developing strong and mutual romantic feelings for each other, but are reluctant to confess how they feel. Kid Flash and Robin know each other outside the team, aware of the other's secret identities. Wally likes to collect souvenirs from the team's missions, such as T. O. Morrow's robotic eye and Cheshire's mask. Ava Dordi, of the Palo Alto Voice notes that Jason Spisak "captures the Lighthearted essence of Kid Flash well". In Season 2 (set five years in the future), Kid Flash has given up the superhero life and is in a relationship with Artemis with the two living and attending college together. Wally does however, assume the guise of Kid Flash once again during the crisis involving Neutron wherein he assists Impulse and the two Flashes (Jay Garrick and Barry Allen) with containing a major explosion. It is revealed that Wally was aware of Nightwing's plan to fake Artemis's death so she could be placed in deep cover alongside Aqualad. He returns to the team during "Summit" and helps to stop the Reach's final attack on Earth. During "Endgame", he, along with The Flash and Impulse manage to control the Magnetic Field Disruptor but due to his slower speed, the chrysalis energy siphons off onto him, causing him to disappear.
 Superboy / Kon-El / Conner Kent (voiced by Nolan North) – Designation: B04, later D09. Superboy is introduced as a sixteen-week-old clone of Superman (later revealed to be a hybrid clone of Superman and Lex Luthor) created by Project Cadmus. Although he does not have all of Superman's abilities, he has super strength, invulnerability, enhanced hearing, and later infrared vision. Lex Luthor later gave Superboy a set of patches which suppresses Superboy's human DNA, giving him his full Kryptonian abilities, similar to those of Superman's; however they only last for typically an hour, and his aggression increases as well. Superboy is typically sullen, ill-tempered, grumpy, and hates being told what to do. His nonexistent relationship with Superman only adds to this anger. He and Miss Martian also begin to develop strong and mutual romantic feelings for each other. They become couple when they go under cover in Belle Reve together and attempt to keep their romance a secret until everyone eventually finds out. Five years after the events of Season 1, Superboy has remained on with the Team and his formerly apprehensive relationship with Superman has greatly improved, with Superman now referring to him as a brother. Conner is more in control of his anger, resourceful and more familiar with alien technology. Superboy has also recently ended his and Miss Martian's relationship due to M'gann using her telepathic powers to violently extract information from enemies; even more so, she tried to tamper with his mind to try and make him forget that he was upset with her. Despite their break up, they still remain very much in love with each other and while they attempt to ignore and hide their feelings, they finally work on restoring their relationship by the end of the season. In Season 3, set two years later, Conner and M'gann have fully mended their relationship and they now live together in Happy Harbor. Conner proposes to M'gann in the premiere and they become engaged. Superboy joins Nightwing's team and works on training the new young heroes alongside Nightwing, Tigress and Black Lightning, but still retains his place on the Team while at the same time, Superboy is beginning to feel the pressure to step up in Superman's absence. By the end of the season, Superboy reveals himself as Superman's clone, becomes a public hero and joins the Outsiders. In Season 4, Superboy and Miss Martian travel to Mars in preparation for their long-awaited wedding, while unaware they secretly being followed by Saturn Girl, Phantom Girl and Chameleon Boy, who are protecting Superboy against Lor-Zod to save their future since Superboy's inspiration and heroism would form the Legion of Super-Heroes. Superboy later sacrifices himself to stop Ma'alefa'ak's bomb from killing the martian race and appeared to have died in the process due to the bomb having been laced with kryptonite, but unknown to everyone, he is revealed to be alive and was saved by Phantom Girl, who sent them both into the Phantom Zone in an effort to save Superboy, but was left comatose. Superboy attempts to remain strong, but begins to suffer from Zone-Sickness, causing hallucinations as well as amnesia, and later encounters General Zod, Lor-Zod’s father, who begins to take advantage and manipulate him. Superboy is later reunited with his friends who have come to rescue him, but due to lingering Zone-Sickness and believing he can't trust himself anymore, he remains under Zod’s control. Eventually, Superboy is finally freed from the Phantom Zone and his mind restored after being reunited with Miss Martian and works together alongside Superman and the original team to defeat the Zod's once and for all. By the end of the series, Superboy and Miss Martian finally get married in a private ceremony with all their closest friends and family, and he is subsequently shown to have rejoined the Outsiders in the Targets miniseries.
 Miss Martian / M'gann M'orzz / Megan Morse (voiced by Danica McKellar) – Designation: B05. Miss Martian is Martian Manhunter's teenage niece, as well as being an inexperienced superhero. As a Martian, she has telekinesis, telepathy, and flight. Additionally, she can shape-shift to a limited extent. She has stated that she cannot become intangible as her uncle can, implying that this is an advanced skill; but by Season 2, she had learned this power. In later episodes, Martian Manhunter discovers that her raw abilities, particularly in terms of telepathy and mind control, are potentially greater than his own. She pilots her own bio-ship, which transports the team and can become camouflaged with the surrounding area. She is kind and optimistic, but has a naive streak born of having learned about life on Earth through television shows. In line with this, she makes regular use of the catchphrase "Hello, Megan!" when suddenly realizing something. She becomes romantically involved with Superboy while working undercover with him in Belle Reve. While it is revealed to the viewer in the episode "Image" that she is concealing her identity as a non-humanoid White Martian, she finally reveals her true form to the team in the episode "Usual Suspects", though Superboy had known since they had mind-bonded in the past. Danica McKellar thinks her character is "Awesome. Like most of the characters on the show, she's dealing with two very different but coexisting aspects of her life: she's a superhero and also an insecure teenager, all at the same time." In Season 2, five years later, she has become more confident in her abilities and lost her naive streak. Garfield Logan (the current Beast Boy) from the episode "Image" has become her adopted brother after the death of his mother. Miss Martian and Superboy are also revealed to have ended their relationship and following their break up, she has started dating Lagoon Boy. It's later revealed Superboy ended their romantic relationship because he disapproved how M'gann was abusing her powers to get information from her enemies, rendering the victim in a comatose state, to the point where she's "no better than Psimon", but the final straw was when she attempted to make him forget he was upset with her. However, she eventually comes to realize the error of her ways on how she has been abusing her powers and later breaks up with Lagoon Boy when she admits he was only her rebound boyfriend during "Intervention". By the end of the season, she begins to repair her relationship with Superboy. In Season 3, M'gann has become the leader of the Team and has adopted a new appearance that more closely resembles her White Martian heritage while her relationship with Superboy has been fully restored as they now live together and have recently gotten engaged. Miss Martian is later revealed to secretly be a member of the Anti-Light, consisting of other leaders to secretly use the Light's methods against them which are later exposed, causing a strain on her relationship with Superboy. By the end of the season, however, Miss Martian steps down as leader of the Team and reconciles with Superboy. In Season 4, Miss Martian and Superboy travel to Mars to have a traditional Martian wedding ceremony with Beast Boy and Martian Manhunter accompanying them, but get drawn into the planets escalating problems. Miss Martian is left heartbroken when Superboy is supposedly killed, having sacrificed himself to save the martian population from a deadly bomb left by her brother and Lor-Zod. Miss Martian confronts M'comm to avenge Superboy, but discovers he had nothing to do with the Kryptonite laced into the bomb and when the Justice League run out leads in the investigation, she falls deeper into mourning, but has begun to accept the help and support of her family and friends and later attempts to help Beast Boy come to terms with his grief and mental health. Eventually, she finally comes to learn of Superboy's survival after meeting his savior, Phantom Girl and sets out with the other heroes to free him from the Phantom Zone and the Zods control over him. By the end of the series, Miss Martian and Superboy are reunited and finally get married.
 Tigress / Artemis / Artemis Crock (voiced by Stephanie Lemelin) – Designation: B07. Artemis was the team's fifteen-year-old archer. Like Robin, she has no superpowers, but is very skilled with a bow and arrow. She is introduced as Green Arrow's "niece" but it is later revealed that this is not the case. Red Arrow, who knows she isn't, believes that there was good reason behind Batman and Green Arrow's decision to add her to the team, as well as their concealment of her real identity, and therefore agrees not reveal his suspicions about her to the rest of the group—but warns Artemis to not harm his friends. She is the daughter of the villain Sportsmaster and the now paraplegic ex-villain Huntress, as well as the sister of Cheshire. In Season 2 (set five years in the future), she and Wally West (Kid Flash) left the superhero life, and are in a relationship, with the two living and attending college together, also owning a dog named Brucely (based on a real dog Stephanie Lemelin owned, and later shown to have the designation C03) which Wally got for her. She returns to duty, only to subsequently fake her death so she can go undercover with Aqualad within Black Manta's organization, adopting the identity Tigress, and apparently help him complete his long-term mission. Nightwing supplies her with a charmed necklace crafted by Zatanna to conceal her true appearance. As part of her cover, she fakes a discreet love affair with Aqualad when questioned. After Wally's sacrifice during "Endgame", she returns to the team using her Tigress identity with her blonde hair. During the time skip between season 2 and 3, Artemis retired again, her and Brucely moving in with her sister's family before helping Nightwing with the Outsiders. Artemis continues to silently mourn Wally's loss, but after seeking help from Zatanna, she later manages to finally come to terms and accept he is gone, allowing herself to move on with her life. Tigress later becomes the Team's newest leader. In Season 4, Artemis is revealed to have become a college professor teaching literature, as well as in a relationship with Jason Bard, and is finally truly enjoying and moving on with her life. However, she falls into mourning after learning about Conner's death which motivates her to reach out to Cheshire until she finds herself dealing with members of the League of Shadows, both claiming to have defected. Artemis seeks Jade's help in learning which among them is telling the truth and further assistance in rescuing her teammate, Orphan who was kidnapped by the Shadows in exchange for Cassandra and Onyx. In the end, Artemis and Jade begin to truly reconcile and Artemis accepts Cheshire's decision to stay on Infinity Island with Ra's al Ghul's faction to reform herself. By the end of the season, Artemis learns of Superboy's survival, works alongside members of the original Team to save him from the Phantom Zone, defeats the Zods and happily serves as a bridesmaid at Miss Martian and Superboy's wedding.

Expanded members
The following members were added to the team after the series premiere at different times:

 Doctor Fate / Zatanna / Zatanna Zatara (voiced by Lacey Chabert) – The daughter of Justice League member, Zatara. She first appears in "Humanity" and sporadically through the later episodes. Zatanna is often annoyed by her father's overprotectiveness, but is devastated when he sacrifices himself to become the new Doctor Fate. In the aftermath, she permanently moves into Mount Justice and becomes an official member of the team in the episode "Misplaced". Her powers, like her father's, are magical, and like her father's, her spells are spoken in reverse order. In Season 1, Zatanna and Robin develop feelings for each other and their romance grows as Robin comforts Zatanna after her father's sacrifice. By the end of season 1, she kisses Robin and they officially begin a romantic relationship. However, the relationship does not last, breaking up sometime in the five years, but Zatanna and Robin, later Nightwing, still remain on good terms. By the beginning of Season 2, Zatanna joins the Justice League alongside Rocket. In the ongoing years, she grows as one of the most powerful sorcerers in the world and even takes on several protégés over time. In Season 4, Zatanna and her protégés face off against Child, a new and far deadlier Lord of Chaos who has come to wreak havoc on the world. With the help of both Doctor Fate and Klarion, they succeed in defeating Child and in the process, Zatanna and Nabu reach a new agreement. Zatanna volunteers herself and two of her protégés to become rotating hosts for Doctor Fate, freeing Zatara and reuniting father and daughter at long last which was secretly her hidden agenda all along. Zatanna also sees a vision of Superboy trapped in another dimension, but remains unaware that he is still alive, believing she had seen his spirit. It is only after she reaches out and gathers various magicians and in her role as Doctor Fate, casts a searching spell that she confirms Conner's survival. By the end of the season, Zatanna and the original Team work together to rescue Superboy from the Phantom Zone and afterwards, Zatanna serves as one of Miss Martian's bridesmaids at her and Superboy's wedding. Designation: B08, later 25.
 Red Arrow / Speedy II / Will Harper / Roy Harper (voiced by Crispin Freeman) – Red Arrow is the team's male archer. Like Robin and Artemis, he has no superpowers, but is very skilled with a bow and arrow. He is also the adopted son of Green Arrow. Originally Speedy, he left Green Arrow's side in "Independence Day", as a result of feeling patronized by the League, who continued to treat him and the others as sidekicks dependent on their mentors, and adopted the alias Red Arrow. He refused to join the group in "Welcome to Happy Harbor". However, he still assisted the team such as in "Targets" and is convinced by Green Arrow to join the team in "Insecurity". In the episode "Usual Suspects", he becomes the first member of the Team to join the Justice League as a full member. However, in "Auld Acquaintance", Harper is told by Vandal Savage that he is a Cadmus clone much like Superboy and was the "mole" implanted by the Light, while the original Roy Harper is in custody of the enemy. In Season 2, Roy is shown on the edge of a breakdown, still searching for his original counterpart. In the episode "Salvage", it is revealed that Roy married Cheshire and unknowingly fathered a daughter with her. Cheshire is willing to help him find his original counterpart so as to help Roy find some peace. Shortly after Roy and Cheshire flew to Tibet to find the original Roy they recover and bring him back to America, where the real Roy Harper recovers in the Star City hospital with the clone and Green Arrow watching over him. He later teams up with Cheshire to deactivate one of the Reach bombs in "Endgame" and later retires to be with his daughter. In Season 3, Roy has changed his name to Will and has started his own private security company, Bowhunter Security. He resides in Star City and lives with Artemis, who helps him to take care of his daughter, Lian. In season 4, he is shown to be a possible reserve member of the Justice League and later serves as one of Superboy's groomsmen at the wedding. In the Targets comic, it was revealed Red Arrow had previously failed to save King Josef, Perdita's father, during his time still under the control of Sportsmaster, and promised not to lose her either, which is hampered by an army of drones loyal to Count Vertigo capturing her. Designation: B06, later 21.
 Rocket / Raquel Ervin (voiced by Kittie in season 1 and season 2, Denise Boutte in "Intervention" and season 3) – Straightforward and bold, if inexperienced, Rocket is the apprentice of the superhero Icon. She uses a piece of alien technology called an inertia belt, allowing her to store and manipulate kinetic energy. She generally uses this to fly and grant herself some super-strength and a personal force field. She joins the team in the episode "Usual Suspects", the same episode her mentor joins the Justice League. In the five years between Seasons 1 and 2, she has joined the Justice League and is engaged. As of Season 3, she has had a son, Amistad. In season 4, she struggles with Amistad's autism as she goes with Forager and Jay Garrick to New Genesis for a conference with the New Gods and the Green Lantern Corps, but develops an untrusting relationship with Orion after learning he is the son of Darkseid, but eventually comes to accept and make peace with him as well as Amistad's autism after finally coming to terms and understanding their struggles. During this time, Rocket comes to learn about the existence of the Phantom Zone and encounters Lor-Zod who steals the Phantom Zone Projector to free his imprisoned parents, but remains unaware of his role in Superboy's apparent death and later witnesses a brief glimpse of the Zone before the Projector is destroyed. Towards the end of the season, Rocket comes to learn Superboy is still alive and realizes he is trapped inside the Phantom Zone and sets out with the rest of the original Team to save him and bring him back. She is briefly thought to have perished when trapped inside a collapsing Boom Tube, but is saved and brought to Metron's vault and later goes to Metropolis to help her friends. She attends Miss Martian and Superboy's wedding as a bridesmaid and agrees to parole the captive Kryptonians on Trombus. Designation: B09, later 26.
 Aquagirl / Tula (voiced by Cree Summer) - A student at Atlantis's Conservatory of Sorcery and Kaldur's former love interest. When Kaldur began spending more time on the surface world, Tula entered into a relationship with Garth. She joined the Team during the five years in between Seasons 1 and 2, but died on a mission which left Aqualad devastated. This event was used as a ruse for him to serve as the Team's mole to uncover the secrets of The Light's unidentified partner (who turned out to be Black Beetle of the Reach). Designation: B11.
 Oracle / Batgirl / Barbara Gordon (voiced by Alyson Stoner) – Originally a classmate of Dick's at the Gotham Academy. In the time between Seasons 1 and 2, she assumed the identity of Batgirl and became a member of the Team. Between Seasons 2 and 3, she's become paralyzed, has taken on the Oracle identity and has begun a romantic relationship with Nightwing. She is a member of the Anti-Light, serving as technical support to the various team of superheroes, including Nightwing's team. Her paralysis is revealed to have caused by Orphan when she was sent to kill Joker, and she jumped in the way to take the blow from her. Designation: B16.
 Bumblebee / Karen Beecher (voiced by Masasa Moyo) – A young scientist and girlfriend of Mal Duncan. She and Mal were classmates of Superboy and Miss Martian at Happy Harbor High School. Her suit acts as armor and imbues her with bee-themed powers including shrinking, and flight. Karen often works with Professor Palmer a.k.a. the Atom; at one point, they attempted to remove the scarab from Jaime, but its defenses nearly killed them. As of Season 3, she has left the Team and became pregnant. Later in the season, she gives birth to a daughter, repairs a hole in her heart, and activates her meta-gene to give her a better life. She is shown in season 4 to be a possible reserve member of the Justice League and serves as a bridesmaid at Miss Martian and Superboy's wedding. Designation: B17, later E06.
 Guardian III / Mal Duncan (voiced by Kevin Michael Richardson) – The boyfriend of Karen Beecher and classmate of Superboy and Miss Martian at Happy Harbor High School. Sometime between Season 1 and Season 2, he was brought on as mission coordinator for the team. Like Nightwing, Robin, Red Arrow, and Arsenal, Mal Duncan lacks super powers. During an encounter with Despero in "Cornered," he assumed the Guardian superhero armor which had previously belonged to Jim Harper. By the time of "War", he operates as a full member of the team as the Guardian. As of season 3, he has retired from the Team so he can be with Karen and his daughter. Despite this, he is shown in season 4 to be a possible reserve member of the Justice League. Designation: B24.
 Aquaman III / Lagoon Boy / La'gaan (voiced by Yuri Lowenthal) – A student at Atlantis' Conservatory of Sorcery. Sometime during the five-year lapse between Seasons 1 and 2, he joined the Team. He and Miss Martian also became romantically involved until Miss Martian ended the relationship in "Intervention" when she realized he was only her rebound boyfriend and that she still loved Superboy. He was temporarily a prisoner of The Reach, captured by Aqualad as a way to spare his life. Lagoon Boy was later rescued during the raid on the Reach's ship. Between Seasons 2 and 3, Lagoon Boy has left the Team and returned to Atlantis. In Season 4, Lagoon Boy has greatly changed and matured and is revealed to be in a happy polyamorous marriage while excitingly awaiting the birth of his child alongside his wife and husband. Lagoon Boy also expresses shame and remorse over his past grudge against Superboy and feels guilty he never made amends. Lagoon Boy is selected to join the Justice League and will now share the mantle of Aquaman alongside Kaldur and Orin. Designation: B18, later 45.
 Arsenal / Speedy I / Roy Harper (voiced by Crispin Freeman) – The original Roy Harper. Eight years before Season 2, it was revealed that Lex Luthor captured Speedy and amputated part of his right arm to create a clone that would serve as The Light's mole. Having fulfilled his purpose as a mole, The Light no longer had a use for him, prompting the clone to join The Team and find the original Roy. However, during the five-year transition between Seasons 1 and 2, everyone except his clone counterpart assumed The Light killed off Harper. The original Roy was found in Tibet by his clone counterpart and Cheshire. After recovery in "Satisfaction", Roy learns the whole truth behind the events of the first two Seasons and recalls of dealing with Luthor in his last mission, prompting him to take vengeance. Although Roy almost succeeds, Lex anticipated this and outnumbers him. In exchange for his life, Lex gives Roy a mechanical arm filled with high-tech weapons. Roy accepts Luthor's offer minutes later upon Green Arrow and Red Arrow's arrival and adopts the persona Arsenal. After his paranoia caused the Team to be captured by the Reach, Arsenal is booted from the Team until he can get his paranoia under control. This causes him to take up the offer to ally with the meta-humans Luthor had previously employed. After Arsenal gets the truth out of Lex Luthor during his web chat with the group about Deathstroke's secret mission, Arsenal and those with him cut off all ties with Lex Luthor and go on their own path. In Outsiders, Arsenal helps his "brothers" Will and Jim with a mission for Will's company Bowhunter Security. In the canonical audio episode "The Prize," Arsenal accepts an offer to return to the team from its newest leader, Tigress. He later shows up to help Artemis when Onyx is stalking her. Designation: B25.
 Tempest / Garth (voiced by Yuri Lowenthal) – Aqualad's best friend and a student at Atlantis's Conservatory of Sorcery. Garth assisted Kaldur and Aquaman against Ocean Master and was offered the chance to become Aqualad, but declined, while Kaldur accepted. Garth continued his studies in the Conservatory and later entered a relationship with Tula. He joined and left the Team during the time between Seasons 1 and 2. In Season 3, he serves as an ambassador for Atlantis at the United Nations. In season 4, he is shown to be a possible reserve member of the Justice League. Designation: B10, later E03.
 Troia / Donna Troy (voiced by Grey DeLisle) - A former protege of Wonder Woman who joined then left the Team between the events of the first two seasons. In Season 3, she became an ambassador for Themyscira at the United Nations and is elected to replace Lex Luthor as U.N. Secretary General after he is forced to resign. In season 4, she is shown confronting one of Child's fire pillars alongside Wonder Woman and Wonder Girl, and is a possible reserve member of the Justice League. Designation: B12.
 Arrowette / Cissie King-Jones (voiced by Kelly Stables) - She appears as a member of the team in Season 3 before leaving with Spoiler and Robin to join Batman's vigilante movement, Batman Inc. She later returns in season 4 to help out Artemis when Onyx shows up. Designation: B27, later Z08.
 Spoiler / Stephanie Brown (voiced by Mae Whitman) - She appears as a member of the team in Season 3 before leaving with Arrowette and Robin to join Batman's vigilante movement, Batman Inc. She briefly appears in season 4 when discussing with Artemis about whether Onyx and Cassandra Savage are trustworthy, stating that she trusts Cassandra's judgement due to also being the daughter of a supervillain known as Cluemaster. She is implied to have become Tim Drake's new girlfriend during the wedding of Superboy and Miss Martian. Designation: B28, later Z09.
 Halo / Gabrielle Daou / Violet Harper (voiced by Zehra Fazal) - A young Quraci metahuman who was nearly buried by Bedlam thugs, believing them to be dead, before they suddenly resurrect themselves and are rescued by Tigress; joining the Outsiders as a result. Later on, it is revealed that their real name's "Gabrielle Daou" and that they were a refugee who used to work for Markovia's royal family. Despite this, they says their name is "Violet", after Brion gave them the name after seeing their violet aura. In "Nightmare Monkeys", it's further revealed that "Violet" is actually the spirit of a Mother Box, which inhabited Daou's body after she was killed by Bedlam's experiments, specifically Helga Jace when she tested negative for the metagene. This makes Granny Goodness capture them for the Anti-Life Equation. They initially dated Brion, until he betrayed the Team and usurped his brother as king of Markovia in the season 3 finale. They make a brief appearance in season 4 to wish Conner and M'gann good luck for their wedding, before discussing with Black Canary about exploring Islam. They officially come out as non-binary later in season 4 and start a relationship with Harper Row. Designation: G03, later B31.
 Orphan / Cassandra Wu-San - Daughter of Lady Shiva, and a former member of the League of Shadows, now sword-wielding member of Batman's vigilante movement via Robin. Trained by her mother to be the ultimate assassin, Lady Shiva forbade her daughter to learn to read and had Cassandra's vocal cords severed when she was an infant to prevent her from speaking. She silently is distrustful of Onyx's and Cassandra Savage's claims of defection. Shiva later captures her to force Artemis to bring Cassandra Savage to Santa Prisca in exchange, but it is also revealed in a flashback that she was the one who crippled Barbara Gordon, who jumped in the way of her sword to defend Joker from being killed by her, though she holds no grudge and claims she was saving her instead. When Cassandra Savage is revealed as the mole, Shiva in turn states she only wanted her daughter all along, but Orphan's continued refusal to obey her mother leads Shiva to provoke her by threatening to kill Barbara, and ends up with Shiva bested by her own daughter, who still manages to spare her life. Designation: Z10, later B36.
 Mist / Andie Murphy (voiced by Daniela Bobadilla) - A metahuman who can turn into living vapor. She was part of a squad of trafficked metahumans, alongside Livewire and Shade, who were fought by Nightwing's splinter team, before being apprehended and set to the Metahuman Youth Center to reform. She is shown in a cameo shot to have joined the Team between seasons 3 and 4, as she is shown helping Tigress and Halo with fighting Black Manta's minions. Designation: B37.

"The Outsiders"
The Outsiders are a group of teen superheroes that work as part of the Team, but in the limelight.

 Beast Boy / Garfield Logan (voiced by Logan Grove in seasons 1 and 2, Greg Cipes from season 3 onward) - In the Season 1 episode "Image", Garfield lives with his mother Marie who runs the Logan Reserve around the borders of Bialya and Qurac. In this episode, it is revealed that Marie Logan once starred in a television show called Hello Megan! that inspired Miss Martian's human guise and her catchphrase. Garfield is hurt when Queen Bee's jets attack and needs a blood transfusion to survive following him freeing the sick oryx and an injured wildebeest from the barn. Miss Martian changes her blood type to O negative to save Garfield's life, which also gives him green skin and eyes and the ability to shape-shift into animals with his hero disguise having monkey-like features. In between Seasons 2 and 3, he's left the Team to become a television star after his godmother's husband took custody of him. Despite this, he used his celebrity status to speak out against metahuman trafficking. He is also revealed to be in a celebrity relationship with Perdita, the young queen of Vlatava. In "Nightmare Monkeys", it's revealed that he was a member of the Doom Patrol until they all died on a dangerous mission. After realizing his boss, Gretchen Goode, has sinister intentions, he rejoins the Team, but realizing it lacks the ways to inspire and give hope to young Meta-teens, he decides to form The Outsiders, a new public team of young heroes. In Season 4, Beast Boy travels to Mars to attend Miss Martian and Superboy's wedding ceremony, but begins showing signs of stress and PTSD as a result of all his traumatic losses. Following the death of Superboy, Garfield becomes severely depressed and soon his life begins to fall apart when he refuses to join the Outsiders on missions, becomes addicted to sleeping pills and breaks up with Perdita. After an intervention involving Miss Martian, the Outsiders, and Robotman fails to shake him, therapy with Black Canary reveals he feels guilty and responsible over being unable to save his friends and family. At a therapy session in Taos, he reveals he now owns a therapy dog named Wingman and is on the road to recovery from his trauma. By the end of the season, he serves as a groomsmen at Superboy and Miss Martian's wedding and reunites with Perdita, but she chooses not to renew their relationship. He resumes active duty as an Outsiders member in the Targets comic when Perdita is captured. Designation: B19, later D01.
 Blue Beetle III / Jaime Reyes (voiced by Eric Lopez) – Shortly before the beginning of Season 2, he recently joined the Team. A device called the Scarab is permanently attached to his spine, providing him a battle suit and advises him on what it feels is the best course of action in many situations. However, Jaime frequently ignores this advice as it is often aimed at violent solutions to problems and is seen at these times to be talking to himself. Superboy is currently the only person that knows that Jaime is talking to the scarab; Jaime compares it to Jiminy Cricket. The scarab is believed to be the last invention made by Ted Kord before the Light killed him, but it is revealed in the episode "Before the Dawn" that its origins lie with the alien organization known as the Reach, who seek to retrieve the scarab, which will kill Jaime. In the future, a Blue Beetle under control of the Reach is shown to have enslaved the human race which Impulse traveled back in time to prevent from happening. Though the Reach do get control of Jaime's body thanks to the Green Beetle, he, the scarab, and Green Beetle are freed from the Reach thanks to an intervention from the rest of the Team and magic from Zatanna. The scarab decides to work with Jaime as equals, preferring it over enslavement to the Reach. Designation: B22, later D03.
 Geo-Force / Brion Markov (voiced by Troy Baker) - A young prince of Markovia and younger brother to crown Prince Gregor. After losing his parents and learning he tested positive for the metagene, he resolves to avenge his family and put an end to metahuman trafficking like they wanted. However, after Brion becomes a geokinetic metahuman, Gregor banishes him from Markovia both because the process he underwent to activate his metagene is highly illegal and presumably to protect him from those who would seek to harm him simply because he's a meta. Even though he's heartbroken, Brion accepts without trouble and leaves with Superboy to join the Outsiders. His hot-headed, impatient personality can lead to trouble at times, bringing to mind a younger Superboy. During the season, Brion's main goal is to find and locate his missing sister, and he desperately wishes to return to Markovia. Eventually, he succeeds in reuniting with Tara and begins a romantic relationship with Halo. He becomes a member of the Team but leaves in favor to join the Outsiders. However, by the end of the season, after returning to Markovia to once again defeat his uncle and after learning the truth of his sister's deceit, Brion turns against his team and allies and murders his uncle. Brion proceeds to overthrow his brother, Gregor, and becomes King of Markovia, betraying and turning against everyone, but is unaware he is being mind controlled as a puppet ruler for the Light. Designation: G02, later B30.
 Kid Flash II / Impulse / Bart Allen (voiced by Jason Marsden) - A speedster from the future who is the grandson of the current Flash (Barry Allen). Bart is stern and determined to alter history to prevent the post-apocalyptic future from which he comes, but puts on a front as a cheerful and talkative youth to the heroes of 2016. He recites lingo from the future ("feeling the mode"). He came to their time to avert a disaster by a future Neutron. Although Bart was able to cure Neutron, he pretended that he was unable to return to his own time which was still devastated from an as-yet-unknown event. It is revealed in "Before the Dawn" that a Blue Beetle has enslaved the human race, an event that Bart is trying to change by keeping him out of the clutches of the Reach. During "Endgame", he and Wally play a pivotal role in stopping the Reach's Endgame weapons, though it cost the latter's life. Following this, he took on the mantle of Kid Flash in honor of Wally. As the only other expert on time travel around, Bart is later visited by Saturn Girl and Chameleon Boy, agreeing to build them a Cosmic Treadmill in exchange for hearing their story. Reported missing due to his involvement with the Legion, he is caught on camera by the Team as having stolen several parts for them, as well as suppression collars. When Bart tried to use the collars on Lor-Zod and Ma'alefa'ak, Lor could move quickly as well, so Bart and the Legion were captured and collared themselves when the villains boarded the Bio-Ship. Designation: B23, later D04.
 Static / Virgil Hawkins (voiced by Bryton James) - Virgil Hawkins is a teenage boy who was waiting at the train station to meet up with his sister until he was captured by agents of the Light and handed over to the Reach. He was rescued by the Team, after which he was transferred to S.T.A.R. Labs in Taos, New Mexico. While in therapy with Black Canary, Virgil unknowingly displays his manifested electrical powers when a bunch of paper clips ended up stuck together by his electrostatic abilities. After he, along with the other S.T.A.R. Labs runaways, rescues members of the Team from the Warworld, and subsequently participates in the final battle against the Reach, Static joins the Team in the episode "Endgame". Designation: B26, later D05.
 Wonder Girl / Cassie Sandsmark (voiced by Mae Whitman) – Wonder Woman's sidekick. She joined the team sometime between the events of Season 1 and Season 2. She is energetic and often impulsive, but a talented fighter. According to Miss Martian, after Wally's death, Cassie kissed Tim Drake and the two of them began a relationship, though apparently only Miss Martian and Superboy are aware of this. The realization of how precious and fragile life is brought about her decision. In Outsiders it is revealed that their relationship is under strain due to Tim's decision to leave the Team. Designation: B21.
 El Dorado / Eduardo "Ed" Dorado Jr. (voiced by Freddy Rodriguez) - Eduardo Dorado Jr. is the son of Eduardo Dorado Sr. He was captured by agents of the Light and handed over the Reach for experimentation while trying to run away to his dad. Eduardo was rescued by the Team before he was transferred to S.T.A.R. Labs in Taos, New Mexico. Eduardo developed the ability to teleport at will. He joins the Outsiders in Season 3. Greg Weisman has confirmed that Ed is gay, but he is not allowed by Warner Bros. to state exactly who he is dating. Designation: D07.
 Cyborg / Victor Stone (voiced by Zeno Robinson) - An up-and-coming football star who was caught in an explosion during an argument with his father, Dr. Silas Stone, and was fused with a Father Box to save his life. He joined the Outsiders after Halo brought him to them. After sitting in Metron's Mobius Chair, the Father Box tech is replaced with Mobius tech, granting him complete control of his body. He is instrumental in disabling Granny Goodness' Overlord and rescuing Halo from the effects of the Anti-Life Equation. Cyborg appears in season 4 on the Watchtower, helping the Justice League with boom tubes, having joined the Justice League sometime between seasons 3 and 4. Designation: G08, later 39.
 Forager / Fred Bugg (voiced by Jason Spisak) - A young insect-like alien from New Genesis who called the Team for help in investigating attacks on his people's hives, but was banished for doing so. He was granted asylum on Earth by M'gann, where he later joined the Outsiders. In "Another Freak", he uses a glamour charm to assume the identity of "Fred Bugg" to attend Happy Harbor High. He later reveals his true species to his classmates in the season 3 finale, who accept him for who he is. Forager later makes a brief cameo at Happy Harbor, wishing Conner, M'gann, and Bio-Ship good luck. He later catches M'gann up on Gar's depression, and is shown to be high school valedictorian. Forager joins Rocket and Jay Garrick on their trip to New Genesis, where "Forager" is also shown to be a common name among the Bugs, becoming attracted to a female Forager. Designation: G06, later B32 and D10.
 Terra / Princess Tara Markov (voiced by Tara Strong) - Princess of the Markovian royal family, and sister of Prince Gregor and Brion who disappeared two years before the events of Season 3. During that time, she joined the League of Shadows as a masked assassin and gained geokinetic powers. As part of Deathstroke's plan, she was "rescued" by the Outsiders and subsequently joins them so she can infiltrate them for the Light. However, she turns on Deathstroke after Tigress talks to her and reminds her of the kindness that the Outsiders showed her. This is one of the few incarnations of Terra not to commit to the character's typically villainous actions. She redesigned her costume offscreen between seasons 3 and 4, and makes a brief cameo at Happy Harbor, wishing Conner and M'gann good luck. Terra later appears when discussing with Artemis about whether Onyx and Cassandra Savage are trustworthy, finding Onyx's claims reliable due to her being a less experienced assassin. She later responds to Child's chaos, joining Red Tornado in saving civilians in Australia. Designation: G07, later B33 and D11.
 Stargirl / Courtney Whitmore (voiced by Whitney Moore) - Host of Goode World Studios; she is seen interviewing Beast Boy and announcing to the world the trending success of the Outsiders and interviewing Infinity Inc. She later becomes Stargirl, a hero who wields a Cosmic Staff, and joins the Outsiders between seasons 3 and 4, as confirmed in a photograph and through a group of Martians resembling Outsiders members. During the Targets miniseries, her staff is broken during the Outsiders' mission in Bialya. Designation: D13.
 Looker / Lia Briggs (voiced by Grey Griffin) - A young Scottish metahuman telepath who was captured by Klarion and rescued by the Outsiders after being shown assisting Lady Shiva while under mind control. She is shown in a photograph to have joined the Outsiders between seasons 3 and 4. Designation: D16.
 Livewire / Leslie Willis (voiced by Britt Baron) - A metahuman with electrical powers and an adversary of Superman. While being controlled, she was apprehended by Nightwing's splinter Team, Black Lightning being the one to defeat her, and sent to the Metahuman Youth Center, where she is reformed. A photograph confirms she joined the Outsiders between seasons 3 and 4. Designation: D14.
 Robin III / Tim Drake (voiced by Cameron Bowen) – The third person to adopt the Robin identity, after Dick Grayson (who has since become Nightwing), and Jason Todd (who is now deceased). Nightwing acts as something of a mentor to Tim, though Tim is far more hesitant and cautious than Dick was when he was Robin. By the events of the season finale, he is in a relationship with Wonder Girl. Two years later Tim and Cassie are still dating, though he leaves the team with Spoiler and Arrowette in a pre-planned resignation to join Batman's vigilante movement, Batman Inc. Tim is later revealed to be a member of the Anti-Light, alongside the Bat Family and Justice League and Team leaders to fight back against the Light using their methods. By the end of the season, he rejoins the Team, along with Arrowette and Spoiler. It is implied that the Anti-Light operation also lead to his breakup with Wonder Girl. A cameo appearance in a photograph confirms he joined the Outsiders between seasons 3 and 4. During Superboy's and Miss Martian's wedding, Spoiler is shown leaning into his shoulder, implying that she has become his girlfriend. Designation: B20, later Z07 and D12.
 Windfall / Wendy Jones (voiced by Zehra Fazal) - A young aerokinetic Australian metahuman from the Metahuman Youth Center. She initially struggles with her metahuman powers, even wearing a collar to suppress them when she loses control, only to take if off in the season 3 finale when she feels she can control them. A photograph confirms she joined the Outsiders between seasons 3 and 4.

"Sentinels of Magic"
The Sentinels of Magic is a school of magical-based superheroes tutored by Zatanna. After stopping the Child's reign of chaos, they all (except for Mary) enter an unwritten contract with Nabu to temporarily become Doctor Fate, a duty which they will share with both Zatanna and Zatara.

 Doctor Fate / Thirteen / Traci Thurston (voiced by Lauren Tom) - A member of the Team who specializes in bad luck and urban magic. She also has a pet iguana named Leroy. Her insecurities to prove herself as a hero and magician, alongside her fear of failure, are ongoing challenges in her life. In "Illusion of Control", she is shown to be dating Blue Beetle. When Arion's crown destroys the Arion clone containing Ocean Master's mind, Thirteen is shown to be the second Doctor Fate in the cycle when she confronts Vandal Savage over his failure. Designation: B29.
 Doctor Fate / Khalid Nassour (voiced by Usman Ally) - One of Zatanna's proteges, who specializes in the magic in nature, and is Kent Nelson's nephew. He struggles with balancing between his magical prowess and his medical education, but his Muslim faith and parental support allow him to forge his own path that gives him the chance to do both. He becomes the first new Doctor Fate in Nabu and Zatanna's new agreement to alternate the former's human host on a weekly basis. Later, he is shown to be a possible reserve member of the Justice League.
 Black Mary / Sergeant Marvel / Mary Bromfield (voiced by Erika Ishii) - One of Zatanna's proteges, who specializes in the magic of Shazam. She became so besotted with her powers that she remained in her transformed state all the time, abandoning her life as Mary in the process. Billy and Freddy confronted her and she relinquished her powers and superhero career. She left the group in the aftermath of the Child's terror after being told of her recklessness in magic-siphoning to feed her own, neglecting the well-being and lives of her allies and others around her. After hearing Granny Goodness' voice, Mary then quotes "Shazam"! She is later shown to be a possible reserve member of the Justice League. Ultimately, she has somehow joined Granny Goodness and become a Female Fury, now known as Black Mary. She and Freddy (codenamed Lieutenant Marvel) were previously members of the Team in the time skip between seasons 1 and 2, with Greg Weisman confirming he had a story planned for them in the tie-in comics which was scrapped to fast track the comics closer to season 2. Designation: B15.

Recurring characters

Justice League
The Justice League is the superhero team that protects the Earth from various threats.

 Atom / Ray Palmer (voiced by Jason Marsden) - A superhero who can grow and shrink in size. He joined the Justice League on December 30, 2010. Five years later, it is shown that Bumblebee has become his lab assistant. Designation: 18.
 Aquaman I / King Orin / Arthur Curry (voiced by Phil LaMarr) – Member and co-founder of the Justice League and King of Atlantis. Aqualad served as his sidekick ever since he and Garth helped him defeat Ocean Master in the past. As of Season 3, he has passed on the mantle of Aquaman to Kaldur so he can focus all of his attention on ruling Atlantis. He is married to Mera, with whom he has one son Artur. After Mera fulfills a prophecy to become the high king ruling all the kingdoms underwater, Orin becomes Aquaman again where he shares the title with Kaldur and La'gaan. He is present when Miss Martian returns to the Watchtower and it is revealed Superboy is alive, staying behind while the other heroes go to Trombus. Designation: 06.
 Batman / Bruce Wayne (voiced by Bruce Greenwood) – A member and co-founder of the Justice League and the elected leader of the group. He gives out the missions for the Justice League and the Team. When Vandal Savage infected the Justice League with The Light's Starro-Tech, Batman is one of the six Justice League members to go missing for 16 hours. In an interview at Comic Con, Greenwood differentiates the portrayal of the Caped Crusader in Young Justice: "He's younger, more of a father figure. He's tough, but not as broken (as in Greenwood's previous portrayal of the character in Batman: Under the Red Hood)." On July 27, 2018, he resigns from the Justice League alongside Green Arrow, among others, as a pre-planned response to U.N. secretary general Lex Luthor placing several restrictions on the League to prevent them from intervening in the Light's metahuman trafficking ring. He forms his own team of proteges, whom Black Lightning derisively calls "Batman Inc." After Black Lightning takes over leadership of the Justice League, Batman returns to the fold. Designation: 02, later Z01.
 Batwoman / Kate Kane - Member of the Justice League and an associate of Batman. Though she joined in between seasons 2 and 3, she resigned alongside Batman and Green Arrow, among others, in response to the U.N.'s restrictions on the League on July 27, 2018. Designation: Z06.
 Black Canary / Dinah Lance (voiced by Vanessa Marshall) – Trainer of the Team during Season 1. Series co-creator Greg Weisman has said Black Canary's role on the show was in part because she is his favorite character in the DC universe. She serves as counselor and trainer for the Team. At the end of Season 2, Captain Atom passes Chairperson duties to Black Canary. Designation: 13.
 Black Lightning / Jefferson Pierce (voiced by Khary Payton) - An electric superhero that joined the Justice League. In season 3, he resigns from the League after accidentally killing a little girl on Rann and planned on retiring. However, he's later convinced to join Nightwing's Outsiders. After confronting Nightwing and Batman on their duplicity to defeat the Light, Black Lightning attempts to walk away. However, at the end of the season he accepts the chairmanship of the Justice League from Kaldur'ahm. During Child's attack, Black Lightning later discusses with Superman the possibility of expanding the Justice League's roster to reserves. Designation: 23, later G01.
 Blue Devil / Daniel Cassidy  (voiced by Troy Baker) - A demon-like superhero who occasionally helps the Justice League, serving as the den mother of the Outsiders in season 4.
 Captain Atom / Nathaniel Adams (voiced by Michael T. Weiss) – Member of the Justice League. One issue of the tie-in comics is dedicated to the Team investigating the disappearance of his civilian identity per his orders. His last name is changed in this adaptation from Adam to Adams. In Season 2 after the events of "Alienated," he seems to assume the role as leader of the Justice League while some of its members are away on Rimbor to get a fair trial. At the end of Season 2, Captain Atom passes Chairperson duties to Black Canary. Designation: 12.
 Shazam / Captain Marvel / Billy Batson (voiced by Rob Lowe in the first appearance, Chad Lowe in later episodes, Robert Ochoa as Billy Batson in the first two seasons, Eric Lopez as Billy Batson in season 4) – Member of the Justice League and once served as the substitute den mother when Red Tornado was missing. Considered by IGN to be "the best superhero guest-voicing turn in some time. (Lowe) plays him like your goofy uncle (or little cousin?) who's trying way too hard to fit in with the cool kids. 'I'm really looking forward to hanging with you guys,' he blurts out with unabashed enthusiasm". Weisman notes that the character "will be an important recurring character in the series, so this could ultimately involve multiple episodes for Lowe." The character was voiced by Lowe's brother Chad Lowe, in later episodes. Designation: 15 (A05 as Billy Batson).
 Elongated Man / Ralph Dibny (voiced by David Kaye) - A member of the Justice League with stretching abilities similar to Plastic Man's. He makes his first appearance in season 3 as part of the group of Justice League members seeking to rescue the trafficked metahumans in space.
 Fire / Beatriz Bonilla da Costa - A member of the Justice League with green pyrokinetic powers. In season 3, Nightwing mentions that she crafted a supersuit for Geo-Force.
 Flash II / Barry Allen (voiced by George Eads in the first season and most episodes in the second, James Arnold Taylor in "Endgame" and Season 3) – Member and co-founder of the Justice League. He is the uncle of Kid Flash (Wally West), who served as his sidekick, and grandfather of Impulse (Bart Allen). Designation: 04.
 Flash I / Jay Garrick (voiced by Geoff Pierson) - Now retired, he was the original Flash and member of the Justice Society of America. He is the husband of Joan Garrick and close friends with the West and Allen families. He also assisted Barry, Wally, and Bart in defeating Neutron. In season 3, he's seen attending his wife's funeral and making a social media account to remind Luthor that hero registration didn't work in his day and won't ever work at all. He is officially with the Justice League in season 4, accompanying Rocket and Forager to New Genesis. Jay later celebrates his 102 birthday.
 Green Arrow / Oliver Queen (voiced by Alan Tudyk) – Member of the Justice League. He had Speedy as a sidekick and later Artemis and Arrowette. On July 27, 2018, he resigns from the Justice League alongside Batman, among others, in a pre-planned response to U.N. Secretary General Lex Luthor placing several restrictions on the League to prevent them from intervening in the Light's metahuman trafficking rings. Designation: 08, later Z02.
 Green Lantern / Guy Gardner (voiced by Troy Baker) - A Green Lantern who occasionally helps the Justice League. He is greatly disliked by Hal Jordan and John Stewart due to his obnoxious personality, and they refused to have him join the Justice League with a unanimous "NO". Despite this, he joined the Justice League during the five-year gap in between Seasons 1 and 2. Designation: 24.
 Green Lantern / Hal Jordan (voiced by Dee Bradley Baker) - Member and co-founder of the Justice League. Designation: 05.
 Green Lantern / John Stewart (voiced by Kevin Michael Richardson) - Member of the Justice League. When Vandal Savage infected the Justice League with The Light's Starro-Tech, John Stewart is one of the six Justice League members to go missing for 16 hours due to the Light's manipulations, revealed to be a rampage in Rimbor intended to get Earth noticed by alien worlds. Designation: 14.
 Hardware / Curtis Metcalf - Member of the Justice League with a high tech exo-suit. Though he joined between seasons 2 and 3, he resigned alongside Batman and Green Arrow, among others in response to the U.N.'s restrictions on the League on July 27, 2018. Designation: Z04.
 Hawkman / Katar Hol (voiced by James Arnold Taylor) - Member of the Justice League and husband of Hawkwoman. Designation: 09.
 Hawkwoman / Shayera Hol (voiced by Danica McKellar in season 2, Zehra Fazal in season 3) - Member of the Justice League and wife of Hawkman. When Vandal Savage infected the Justice League with The Light's Starro-Tech, Hawkwoman is one of the six Justice League members to be missing for 16 hours. Designation: 10.
 Ice / Tora Olafsdotter - Member of the Justice League with cryokinetic powers who is often seen with Fire.
 Icon / Augustus Freeman (voiced by Tony Todd) – An alien superhero and the mentor of Rocket. Superman originally believed Icon was Kryptonian. Designation: 20.
 Katana / Tatsu Yamashiro - A samurai-themed member of the Justice League who wields the Soultaker, a sword that can trap the spirits of anyone it kills. Though she joined between seasons 2 and 3, she resigns alongside Batman and Green Arrow, among others, in response to the U.N.'s restrictions on the League. Designation: Z05.
 Magog - Said to be a League member by Guy Gardner in the third-season finale, "Nevermore"
 Martian Manhunter / J'onn J'onzz / John Jones (voiced by Kevin Michael Richardson) – Member and co-founder of the Justice League, and uncle of Miss Martian. When Vandal Savage infected the Justice League with The Light's Starro-Tech, Martian Manhunter is one of the six Justice League members to go missing for 16 hours. Designation: 07.
 Metamorpho / Rex Mason (voiced by Fred Tatasciore) - A member of Batman's vigilante movement with elemental shapeshifting capabilities. Designation: Z11.
 Plastic Man / Patrick "Eel" O'Brian - A superhero with elastic powers who joined the Justice League on December 30, 2010. On July 27, 2018, he resigned alongside Batman and Green Arrow, among others, in response to the U.N.'s restrictions on the League. Designation: 19, later Z03.
 Red Tornado / John Smith (voiced by Jeff Bennett) – Member of the Justice League who served as the den mother for the Team in Season 1. He was originally created by T.O. Morrow to infiltrate the Justice League only for Red Tornado to defect to them. He serves as the Team's "den mother", since he doesn't need sleep to function. Red Tornado has an android body he can transfer his mind into to take on the John Smith persona. As of Season 3, he has adopted Traya Smith as a daughter. Designation: 16.
 Steel / John Henry Irons (voiced by Zeno Robinson) - Member of the Justice League and an associate of Superman. Designation: 36.
 Superman / Kal-El / Clark Kent (voiced by Nolan North) – Member and co-founder of the Justice League and also the husband of Lois Lane and father of Jonathan Samuel Kent. His DNA was used with Lex Luthor's by Project Cadmus to help make Superboy. He was originally apprehensive to Superboy, but in the five years between Season 1 and 2, Superman now considers Superboy to be his little brother and gave him a Kryptonian name, Kon-El. When Vandal Savage infected the Justice League with the Light's Starro-Tech, Superman becomes one of the six Justice League members to go missing for 16 hours. In Season 2, it's revealed Superman and the six Justice League members were sent into space and attacked the planet, Rimbor. As a result, they're forced to leave Earth to attend a trial for their actions and to prove their innocence. In Season 3, Superman is currently traveling through space along with several other Justice League members to stop metahuman trafficking. He is later briefly reunited with Superboy, learns about his engagement, and accepts the honor of being his best man. In season 4, Superman is mourning the loss of Superboy after his presumed death on Mars and teaches his son, Jonny the meaning of life and death. He is later met by Saturn Girl and Chameleon Boy, revealing they were trying to protect Superboy and ask Superman to take his place at crucial moment in ten years at Happy Harbour. He agrees to keep their secret and refuses to give Nightwing and Zatanna intel during their investigation into Bart and Conner's disappearances in order not to disrupt the timeline. By the end of the season, he learns Superboy is still alive after meeting Phantom Girl and trusts her word after confirming she is a member of the Legion after he uses his x-ray vision to spot her Legion ring. He joins the other heroes at Trombus to rescue Superboy until they are attacked by Lor-Zod and M'comm and make their way back to Earth until Superman is taken captive by the Zods and poisoned with Kryptonite. He is healed by Zatanna and works together alongside Superboy to defeat General Zod and send him back to the Phantom Zone. In the aftermath, he finally fulfills his duty and serves as Superboy's best man at his and Miss Martian's long awaited wedding. This version of Superman doesn't have his super or freezing breath and has to use an oxygen mask to breathe in airless environments, due to the fact that the show's creators believe Kryptonians having these abilities wasn't believable. Designation: 01.
 Wonder Woman / Princess Diana / Diana Prince (voiced by Maggie Q) – Member and co-founder of the Justice League, and Princess of the Amazons. When Vandal Savage infected the Justice League with The Light's Starro-Tech, Wonder Woman is one of the six Justice League members to be missing for 16 hours. Designation: 03.
  Doctor Fate / Zatara / Giovanni Zatara (voiced by Nolan North) – Member of the Justice League and father of Zatanna. He was the second substitute den mother while Red Tornado was missing. Due to Nabu (voiced by Kevin Michael Richardson) stating that the world would always need Doctor Fate, Zatara offers himself to become the new Doctor Fate in lieu of his daughter. His Doctor Fate persona was officially inducted into the Justice League on December 30, 2010, with Zatara remaining host through season 2. In Season Three, it is revealed that Zatara struck a deal with Nabu years before the season's events. Once every year, the latter releases the former so he can be with Zatanna for one hour before promptly putting the helmet back on until the next year. A new deal with Nabu in which Zatara rotates the mantle with Zatanna, Thirteen, and Khalid Nassour finally frees him up to be free longer and also enables Zatara to be considered a possible reserve member of the Justice League. He is briefly shown to be Doctor Fate again before he hands the helmet to Zatanna during her investigation into Superboy's whereabouts. Designation: 11 (as Zatara) and 17 (as Doctor Fate).

New Gods of New Genesis
 Forever People - A group of extraterrestrial superheroes from New Genesis. They arrived on Earth to reclaim the "New Genisphere" when they run into Superboy and help him fight Intergang. They can use their Mother Boxes to combine into the Infinity-Man. The Forever People later helps the Team when fighting Ma'alefa'ak.
 Vykin (voiced by Kevin Michael Richardson) - The leader of the Forever People with magnetic powers.
 Big Bear (voiced by Bill Fagerbakke) - A member of the Forever People with super-strength. He mentioned that he was named after a New Genesis animal; attempting to use Wolf as a placeholder, but chose Bear after Conner expressed displeasure at him having the same name as his pet. Though "Bear" proved adequate; due to his friendly bear hugs.
 Beautiful Dreamer (voiced by Grey DeLisle) - A member of the Forever People with psionic powers.
 Serifan (voiced by Dee Bradley Baker) - A member of the Forever People. He is fond of Westerns and dresses like a cowboy.
 Mark Moonrider - A member of the Forever People who can shoot bolts of energy from his hands.
 Orion (voiced by Benjamin Diskin) - A New God from New Genesis. Ma'alefa'ak impersonated him to instigate war between the New Gods and the Bugs of New Genesis. The real Orion is eventually met by Rocket, Forager, and Jay Garrick on New Genesis, and he is shown to be claustrophobic and prone to rage, needing to be calmed down with a Mother Box. He later comes to the Watchtower to help provide a motherbox for the heroes' efforts on Trombus, joining them in the mission there.
 Highfather (voiced by Mark Rolston) - The ruler of New Genesis and Orion's adoptive father.
 Lightray / Solis (voiced by Nolan North) - A New God of New Genesis who can fly and leave trails of light.
 Green Lantern / Forager (voiced by Nika Futterman) - A female Bug from New Genesis who shares the same name as Forager. She smuggles a runction cell for her hive, then becomes the original Forager's new love interest. She is ultimately chosen to wield Tomar's Green Lantern ring upon his death, and forms a long-distance relationship with Forager whilst also becoming a probationary member of the Green Lantern Corps. Forager brings the Kaiser-Thrall to Earth, and goes to Trombus with the other heroes to help free Superboy.

Antagonists

The Light
The Light are the characters in Season 1 who directed the course of events throughout the series. The group was conceived by Vandal Savage who views himself as a first among equals. The leaders act as a board of directors, their identities known only to a select few individuals that work with them. The end goal is improve humanity and set it as a dominant race in the universe: they view the superheroes as interfering with the natural order of things and that Earth must employ survival of the fittest if it intends to exist and thrive in an ever-changing universe.

Among its members are:

 Vandal Savage / Vandar Adg / Varl'jat / Marduk / Genghis Khan (voiced by Miguel Ferrer in the first two seasons; David Kaye in later seasons following Ferrer's passing) – The immortal founder and leader of The Light. Over the course of 15,000 years, Savage had gone by many names and conquered many lands for the sake of power. He convinced Klarion the Witch Boy to channel the latter's chaos power for the former's vision, and formed a partnership with Darkseid and Apokolips to conquer the entire galaxy before the two worlds battle each other for complete supremacy. His 'survival of the fittest' views are why he views the Justice League and other subsequent heroes as a constant obstacle for him and his colleagues. Despite this, he is willing to work with the heroes to defeat a third party (Light-partner or otherwise) if they potentially hinder his long-term plans. He was temporarily given the designation A04 near the end of the first season when the Justice League were mind controlled.
 Cassandra Savage (voiced by Zehra Fazal) - One of Vandal Savage's daughters and current heir, a member of the League of Shadows. In season 4, the left side of her face is scarred with her left eye blind, and her left arm is amputated (though the origins to this is varied). She seeks to defect to the heroes in response to Olympia's death, but Onyx disputes this and suggests she is trying to feign defection as Terra formerly had in the past. It is revealed she lied about her defection as a ruse to get stolen data to the League of Shadows, and she used a glamour charm to fake her new appearance.
 Olympia Savage (voiced by Jenifer Lewis) - One of Vandal Savage's daughters. When she started to become senile, Vandal was forced to mercy kill her by breaking her neck.
 Ra's al Ghul (voiced by Oded Fehr) – Member of The Light and leader of the League of Shadows who is an enemy of Batman. In Season 3, the Team and the Outsiders encounter Ra's al Ghul on Infinity Island, who tells them he is no longer part of the Light or leading the League of Shadows. Though he secretly remains in contact with Vandal Savage.
 Talia al Ghul (voiced by Zehra Fazal) - Ra's al Ghul's daughter and his second-in-command who has a love-hate relationship with Batman. In Season 3, it's revealed she has a son called Damian Wayne. Fazal reprise her role as Talia al Ghul from the film Batman: A Death in the Family. In the tie-in comics, Talia was responsible for turning Matt Hagen into Clayface. 
 Sensei (voiced by Keone Young) – A high-ranking member of the League of Shadows. This version is not Ra's al Ghul's dad.
 Ubu (voiced by Fred Tatasciore) - A super-strong man and member of the League of Shadows who is loyal to Ra's al Ghul.
 Lex Luthor (voiced by Mark Rolston) – Member of The Light, CEO of LexCorp, and archenemy of Superman. He played a part in the creation of Superboy by donating his DNA (to stabilize the uncontrollable Kryptonian half). Lex Luthor was also responsible for the real Roy Harper missing half of his right arm to further the cloning projects. At the end of the second season, he is named Secretary General of the United Nations after helping the Team and the Justice League stop the Reach's plot. In Season 3, Lex Luthor put up restrictions that prevent the Justice League from interfering in the Light's metahuman trafficking rings. While he later creates Infinity, Inc. as his own team of heroes, ultimately, Black Lightning, Cyborg, Superman, and Superboy out him using evidence from Terra's earpiece, forcing him to resign in favor of Troia and negating his restrictions. Despite this, he remained a member of the Light in season 4, and Superboy in the Phantom Zone hallucinates himself doing Lex's bidding until he meets General Zod. The Targets miniseries reveals that Lex Luthor is the true builder of an army of drones loyal to Count Vertigo. He also used the kryptonite found by Perdita to convert Juan Cordero into Metallo. After Perdita is rescued, Kaldur, Zatanna, Rocket, Cyborg, and La'gaan confront Lex and tell him that Perdita is family, and therefore off-limits to further schemes by the Light.
 Mercy Graves - Lex Luthor's cybernetic and silent bodyguard that wears a business suit.
 Queen Bee (voiced by Marina Sirtis) – Member of the Light and dictator of Bialya. In this show, Queen Bee possesses the ability of persuasion over most men and some women, with the Targets miniseries revealing even non-binary beings such as Halo can be enthralled. She is the first to discover Miss Martian's true form and uses this to blackmail her through the first season. It was her military's attack that led to Beast Boy's origin leading Queen Bee to later murder his mother, who Miss Martian idolized, in retaliation. The Targets miniseries reveals that after she enthralls Red Arrow, Arsenal, and Halo, making them attack Miss Martian, Tigress, and Arrowette to the point of seemingly killing them, it's revealed that she cannot control anyone who has eaten garlic, with the three controlled heroes having consumed pills to fake their control and the other three using fake blood.
 Onslaught - A team of Meta-Human Enforcers working for Queen Bee. According to Holocaust, they "paid top dollar".
 Psimon (voiced by Alan Tudyk) - The right-hand man of Queen Bee who has telepathic powers. He often enjoys making the pun "Psimon says", based on the children's game, right before forcing someone to do his bidding. His function for The Light includes extending the range of Queen Bee's influence and being the most useful combatant against telepaths. To that end, he often faces Miss Martian in telepathic battle, usually to his detriment. In Season 3, he and Devastation are a couple.
 Devastation (voiced by Diane Delano) - A heavyset super-strong Caucasian woman who is an adversary of Wonder Woman. During the failed breakout attempt at Belle Reve, she was frozen by Killer Frost (who was trying to hit Superboy). In 2016, Devastation was seen working for Queen Bee in Bialya, preparing abducted runaways to be sent to the Reach. In Season 3, she and Psimon are a couple.
 Mammoth / Baran Flinders - Baran Flinders and his fraternal twin sister, Selinda, were members of The Cult of Kobra. After being injected with a hybrid strain of the Venom drug and the Blockbuster formula by his sister, he developed super strength and became very deformed. After Kobra's defeat, Mammoth was sent to Belle Reve where he took part in a failed breakout attempt. In 2016, Baran was working for Queen Bee in Bialya preparing abducted runaways to be sent to the Reach.
 Shimmer / Selinda Flinders - Selinda Flinders is a martial-artist who was Kobra's right-hand woman. She is also the fraternal twin sister of Baran. After Kobra's defeat, Shimmer was sent to Belle Reve where she took part in a failed breakout attempt. In 2016, Shimmer was working for Queen Bee in Bialya preparing abducted runaways to be sent to the Reach. However, Miss Martian took her out with a brain blast. Later, she was experimented on by the Reach, which activated her metahuman powers of transmutation.
 Icicle Jr. / Cameron Mahkent (voiced by Yuri Lowenthal) - A criminal with cryokinetic powers and the son of Icicle Sr. He attacked a bridge in Star City only to be defeated by Green Arrow and Speedy. He was sent to Belle Reve where he participated in his father's failed breakout plan. During that time he developed romantic feelings for Miss Martian and befriended Superboy when they were disguised as Tuppence and Tommy Terror respectively. When he learns their true identities he has held a grudge against them ever since. In 2016, Icicle Jr. was working for Queen Bee in Bialya preparing abducted runaways to be sent to the Reach. He was also chosen by the Light for a strike team led by Kaldur to capture Blue Beetle. In 2018, he is seen as part of a group of villains collectively called "Onslaught" who work security at a metahuman auction. He encounters and battles against Superboy, showing they've developed a frenemy relationship to the point where he congratulated him upon learning of his engagement to Miss Martian mid-battle. This is also further shown as he attends their wedding at the end of season 4 and catches the bouquet of flowers.
 Terror Twins / Tommy and Tuppence Terror (voiced by Yuri Lowenthal and Danica McKellar respectively) - The Terror Twins are rash and arrogant fraternal twins who possess super-strength and invulnerability. Their arrest was vital in a plan to infiltrate Belle Reve as Superboy and Miss Martian would go undercover as the twins. In 2016, they were chosen by the Light for a strike team led by Kaldur to capture Blue Beetle and some of the other members of "The Team."
 Holocaust (voiced by Zeno Robinson) - A pyrokinetic metahuman who was part of an underground metahuman fight club secretly sponsored by Queen Bee.
 Match (voiced by Nolan North) - He is a genomorph created by Project Cadmus and the first attempt at cloning Superman which didn't go well since Kryptonian DNA is tricky to clone compared to that of earth's lifeforms. His name was derived from Luthor's desire to "have Superman meet his match." Match was freed by Superboy per his "father" Luthor's wishes. However, Match attacked Superboy after seeing his Superman-insignia. He had been programmed to respond to this, to attack Superman. Match then burned a backwards "S" onto his chest with heat-vision, mirroring Bizarro. By using the shields given to him by Luthor, Superboy was able to defeat Match. The pod containing Match was later stolen from Project Cadmus during the Light's raid. In the companion comics, Match is shown to have deformed, perhaps due to his incomplete genetic sequence. In the Targets miniseries, he is shown to have been recruited by Onslaught, battling the Outsiders alongside Mammoth, Shimmer, and Devastation in Greater Bialya. He is not able to contribute as long to the battle due to Metallo's kryptonite affecting him, but when the Outsiders do defeat the Onslaught members, Match is taken to the Fortress of Solitude to heal.
 Ocean Master / Prince Orm (voiced by Roger Craig Smith) – Board member of the Light and Aquaman's half-brother. Sometime after the events of Season 1, he was disgraced upon his identity being exposed to the authorities, incarcerated in Atlantis, and replaced with Black Manta on the Light. He returns in Season 3 operating on his own to kill the Justice League's families only to be killed himself by Lady Shiva to keep him from interfering in the Light's plans. However, the Light's Thrinos operation allowed them to make a clone of Ocean Master and insert the original's mind into a clone body of Arion that would be able to wear Arion's crown. The clone of Ocean Master is eventually cleared of mental programming by Miss Martian and allowed to go free by Aquaman.
 Brain (voiced by Nolan North in his first unofficial appearance, Corey Burton in the first official appearance) – Member of the Light. He was originally a man whose brain was put in a special mobile container. Brain and Klarion the Witch Boy worked with Professor Ivo to weaponize a fragment of Starro to create Starro-Tech. At the end of Season 2, he was captured by the Team and replaced by Ultra-Humanite as of Season 3.
 Monsieur Mallah (vocal effects provided by Dee Bradley Baker) – Brain's gorilla sidekick. In season 3, he appears as a member of the Suicide Squad.
 Klarion the Witch Boy (voiced by Thom Adcox-Hernandez) – Member of the Light and an associate of the Lords of Chaos. He and Brain worked with Professor Ivo to weaponize a fragment of Starro to create Starro-Tech. According to Greg Weisman, Klarion joined the Light mostly because it seemed like fun. His partnership with Vandal lasted millennia, them having met in Atlantis 15,000 years ago and becoming locked in battle for 300 days, until they grew interest in one another. Having sunk Atlantis a long time ago per Vandal's deal with him, he is threatened when Child comes to Earth, seeking to replace him as the main Lord of Chaos. After Teekl was killed in the ensuing fight, he loses his earthly tether, forcing him to possess a school bus that Superman and Superboy saved during the events of season 1. His subsequent travels through time and space revealed him to be behind a running gag in which the bus popped up at peculiar times with the same driver and passengers trapped inside, repeatedly needing saving. He eventually finds Doctor Fate and Zatanna and gets them to help him defeat Child, finding a new cat to anchor himself to. Zatanna seeks him out due to his earlier bus shenanigans for knowledge on how to access the Phantom Zone, but he refuses to help, attacks her and the other heroes, and leaves. Vandal Savage and Ultra-Humanite later have Klarion retrieve most of the Phantom Zone inmates that got sent back to the Phantom Zone and have them imprisoned on Warworld.
 Teekl (vocal effects provided by Dee Bradley Baker) - Klarion the Witch Boy's familiar spirit, who took the form of a cat. If Teekl is destroyed, Klarion will have nothing to anchor him to the mortal realm. Klarion can occasionally power it up into a stronger form, but unlike most depictions of the character, which take the form of a werecat, Teekl's powered up form resembles a ruthless and fearsome Smilodon. Its destruction indeed happens during their fight against the Child, where her familiar Flaw kills Teekl by snapping its neck. However, Klarion is able to regain his presence by possessing another cat, who bears the same markings and name of its predecessor.
 Black Manta (voiced by Khary Payton) – Aquaman's nemesis and an associate of the Light and Aqualad's father. In Season 2, Black Manta replaced Ocean Master on the Light and was later captured by the Team. He later joined the Suicide Squad in Season 3 only to be returned to Belle Reve by the Outsiders.
 Slade Wilson / Deathstroke (voiced by Wentworth Miller in the first appearance, Fred Tatasciore in later appearances) - An assassin who was hired by The Light to replace Sportsmaster when he goes rogue in his quest to get revenge on Black Manta and his son for "killing" Artemis. Deathstroke helped Tigress capture Miss Martian so that Black Manta can have her restore Aqualad back to normal. In a flashback, it was revealed that he and Sportsmaster were responsible for the death of Ted Kord. In Season 3, he has joined the Light's council with Lady Shiva replacing him as enforcer and took Ra's al Ghul's place as leader of the League of Shadows.
 Count Vertigo (voiced by Steve Blum) – Member of the royal family of Vlatava, enemy of Green Arrow, and leader of the Injustice League. He is obsessed with seizing power from his niece, Queen Perdita. Unlike the others, he was not arrested due to his diplomatic immunity, which was revoked later that season by his niece when he was accidentally tricked into revealing his pact with Vandal Savage to ensure the failure of her heart transplant. In season 3, Count Vertigo takes advantage of the metahuman trafficking when he collaborates with Baron Bedlam. He later joins Bedlam in his coup of Markovia when they escape prison. The Targets comic shows him once again escaping prison with the help of an army of drones, which later proceed to capture Perdita. After arriving in Bialya to attempt to stop the rescue of Perdita, he reveals he intends to stage her assassination to set up a comeback story to trick the Vlatavan government into letting him back into power. His portrayal as a Vlatavan count is taken from DC Showcase: Green Arrow, with Steve Blum reprising the role from the short.
 Joe Henchy (voiced by Steve Blum) - Count Vertigo's brutish henchman who aids him in all his crimes. He was originally created for DC Showcase: Green Arrow.
 Sportsmaster / Lawrence Crock (voiced by Nick Chinlund) – A sports-themed agent of the Light. He is the ex-husband of Paula Crock, the father of Artemis and Cheshire, and grandfather to Lian Nguyen Harper. In a flashback, it's revealed that Sportsmaster and Deathstroke were responsible for the death of Ted Kord. When Artemis faked her death, he demanded an "eye for an eye" situation by being allowed to kill Aqualad. After discovering Artemis' survival, he helps her by allowing M'Gann to escape. Sportsmaster looks younger than his actual age which as of 2018 is 62, thanks to being in peak condition.
 Ultra-Humanite (vocal effects provided by Dee Bradley Baker in Season 1, voiced by Greg Weisman in Outsiders) – An albino gorilla supervillain with super-human strength and intellect and enemy of Superman. A former member of the Injustice League, Ultra-Humanite replaced Brain on the Light's council in season 3 where he now speaks through a vocalizer on his harness. In the tie-in comics, Ultra-Humanite was an old lady who transferred her brain into the body of an albino gorilla.
 Dr. Helga Jace (voiced by Grey Griffin) - The personal physician to Markovia's royal family as well as an agent of Bedlam. After Prince Brion was banished, the Outsiders allowed her to come with them to America so she can watch over the young prince as well as Halo. She has also entered a relationship with Black Lightning so she could secretly keep tabs on her young charges. As of the second half of season 3, she has begun making contact with a mysterious individual (later revealed to be the Ultra-Humanite) so she could study Halo further, as she sees her and the Markovs as her "children". In fact, she had a hand in killing Gabrielle Daou and was the one who gave Tara her powers. Designation: G04
 Lady Shiva / Sandra Wu-San (voiced by Gwendoline Yeo) - The League of Shadows' teacher and the Light's new enforcer. She confronted Ocean Master while he was planning to kill the Justice League's families. In response, she killed him by beheading him to prevent him from interfering in the Light's plans. She later fights Katana during Batman's mission to Santa Prisca, showing a desire to claim the Soultaker sword. She is later shown to be Orphan's mother, and captures her as a way to force Artemis to bring Cassandra Savage to Santa Prisca. In reality, because Cassandra Savage was a mole and not really defecting, Shiva just wanted her daughter, and some stolen intel Cassandra Savage was going to provide, all along, but when she threatens to kill Barbara Gordon, Orphan manages to beat her in combat, but refuses to kill her, enraging the experienced assassin.
 Zviad Baazovi (voiced by Yuri Lowenthal) - The ambassador of Markovia at the United Nations; replaced Granny Goodness on the Light's council. He is based on the DC Comics character Bad Samaritan, and has gained a mild psychic ability used to bring out the worst impulses in people. Zviad uses this to turn Geo-Force against the Team and get him to usurp Gregor as the King of Markovia and to motivate metahumans to willingly undergo activation via the tar.

New Gods of Apokolips
 Darkseid (voiced by Michael-Leon Wooley) - The ruler of Apokolips, the Justice League's greatest enemy, and Vandal Savage's master who encountered Vandal during his early days. At the end of "Endgame," it is revealed that Darkseid was the Light's partner throughout season 2. During the events of "Outsiders" however, Darkseid secretly moves against the Light to acquire the Anti-Life Equation so he can enslave the universe.
 DeSaad (voiced by Dee Bradley Baker) - A New God from Apokolips and servant of Darkseid. In season 1, he came to Earth to supply Intergang with Apokoliptan weaponry. He was defeated by the Forever People and Superboy, but got away. He makes brief cameos with Darkseid in later episodes, but he makes another appearance in season 4, providing Ma'alefa'ak with a bomb that could eradicate other Martians.
 Kalibak (voiced by Dee Bradley Baker) - Darkseid's eldest son.
 Grayven (voiced by Dee Bradley Baker) - Another son of Darkseid.
 Granny Goodness / Gretchen Goode (voiced by Deborah Strang) - A New God from Apokolips who joins the Light in Season 3, replacing Black Manta. Under the alias "Gretchen Goode", Granny Goodness works as the founder of Goode World Studios, a studio where Beast Boy works as the lead of Space Trek. Her Goode Goggles, a type of VR technology, is used to test for and traffic metahumans until Beast Boy's use of it called attention to them. She deduces Halo to be the cause of the Anti-Life Equation, which takes away free will, and has her captured, upstaging Vandal Savage and forcing him to sell Granny out to the Team. She is defeated at the end of Outsiders thanks to Halo and Cyborg and is seen being tortured as punishment for her failure, while Zviad Baazovi replaces her on the Light. Despite this, she regains her former position after serving her punishment, and is later heard manipulating Mary Bromfield which led to her somehow ending up in the Female Furies.
 Female Furies - Granny's elite strike force, all of whom she's trained herself.
 Big Barda (voiced by Grey Griffin) - Leader of the Female Furies who built an asteroid base behind Granny's back to assist in their metahuman trafficking efforts.
 Lashina - Member of the Female Furies who wields electric whips.
 Gilotina - Member of the Female Furies who's capable of slicing through any material.
 Supergirl / Kara Zor-El - The daughter of Zor-El and cousin of Superman. At some point in her life, she was in the Phantom Zone until Vandal Savage rounded up all the Kryptonians. He had Supergirl handed over to Darkseid at his demands and joins the Female Furies alongside Black Mary.
 Mantis (voiced by Andrew Kishino) - The former leader of the Bugs of New Genesis. He later sides with Darkseid and is assigned by Grayven to serve Lor-Zod. During his quest to steal the Phantom Zone projector from Metron, Mantis is ultimately able to learn how to operate Lor's Time Sphere and uses it to get the projector, but is later subsequently apprehended by Forager and the Green Lantern Forager.
 Parademons - Darkseid's foot soldiers.

Phantom Zone Inmates
The following are inmates of the Phantom Zone:

 General Dru-Zod (voiced by Phil Morris) - The father of Lor-Zod and enemy of Superman who is trapped in the Phantom Zone with Superboy and Phantom Girl. He had tried to conquer the galaxy in the Legion of-Super Heroes' time shortly after he was paroled from the Phantom Zone, but after he was re-imprisoned, Lor seeks to free him in the present. Manipulating Superboy into siding with him, he opposes the Team's efforts to bring him back with them, then escapes through the Boom Tube on Trombus alongside Ursa, Faora, and Superboy, meeting Lor on the other side. After claiming the Fortress of Solitude on Earth, he attempts to announce the conquest of the planet in Metropolis, giving Superboy the choice to kill Superman. Instead Superboy refuses and is turned back to the side of the heroes, leading to General Zod being banished back to the Phantom Zone by the combined power of Superman and Superboy. Vandal Savage then has all the convicts rounded up and imprisoned in the Warworld when he has Klarion teleport it into the Phantom Zone, Zod included.
 Emerald Empress / Ursa Zod (voiced by Vanessa Marshall) - The wife of Dru-Zod and a fellow prisoner of the Phantom Zone, who joins him in escaping on Trombus. She later bonds with the Eye of Ekron that Lor-Zod stole from Metron's vault and becomes a version of Emerald Empress. After Miss Martian incapacitates her, she wakes to watch Zod's banishment and is whisked away by the Eye. Escaping to Daxam, she discovers her pregnancy, as she originally did in the future Lor-Zod hailed from.
 Faora Hu-Ul (voiced by Denise Boutte) - An inmate of the Phantom Zone loyal to Dru-Zod, often chanting his wills, who joins him in escaping on Trombus. She later returns to the Phantom Zone to rally the troops and gets snatched by a Devourer. She later escaped and join the Earth invasion and got sent back to the Phantom Zone by Rocket.
 Non - Another trapped inmate of the Phantom Zone in loyalty to Dru-Zod. He joins Faora in coming to Earth only to get sent back to the Phantom Zone by the Team.
 Jax-Ur (voiced by Andrew Kishino) - Another inmate of the Phantom Zone loyal to Dru-Zod.
 Vor-Kil (voiced by Phil LaMarr) - Another inmate of the Phantom Zone loyal to Dru-Zod.
 Kru-El (voiced by Nolan North) - Another inmate of the Phantom Zone loyal to Dru-Zod, who is left in charge when Zod escapes.

Other villains
The following villains either operated on their own or have been used by The Light:

 Mr. Freeze / Victor Fries (voiced by Keith Szarabajka) - A Batman villain with cryokinetic powers, being capable of blasting ice with his special gloves. His powers are also used to charge his freeze cannon, but he must wear a cryogenic suit to survive in temperatures that are above -50 degrees. He attacked a park in Gotham City, but was quickly defeated by Batman and Robin. He was sent to Arkham Asylum, but was later transferred to Belle Reve upon pleading sanity where he participated in a supervillain breakout, but was defeated by Superboy, who broke Mr. Freeze's helmet, forcing him to turn his powers on himself to survive.
 Killer Frost / Crystal Frost (voiced by Sarah Shahi) - She is a cryokinetic super-villain. Killer Frost attacked Pearl Harbor, but was defeated by Aquaman and Aqualad. She was then sent to Belle Reve prison where she participated in a super villain breakout. After discovering that Miss Martian was disguised as Tuppence Terror, she froze her. Superboy subdued Frost quickly after seeing Miss Martian's state.
 Captain Cold / Leonard Snart (voiced by Alan Tudyk) - A Flash villain and a thief who uses cryo-technology. He attempted to rob a jewelry store in Central City only to be stopped by Flash and Kid Flash. He was sent to Belle Reve prison where he took part in a failed breakout attempt. He appeared in season 2 when he robbed a bank but defeated by Rocket and the female members of the Team and Justice League.
 Blockbuster / Mark Desmond (voiced by René Auberjonois) - Mark Desmond is a scientist who worked at Project Cadmus and works for the Light. He created the Blockbuster formula and helped Lex Luthor to create Superboy. When Superboy was about to escape the Cadmus, Desmond ingested the Blockbuster formula becoming Blockbuster. He was defeated and sent to Belle Reve where he took part in Icicle Sr.'s failed plan to escape from the prison.
 T.O. Morrow (voiced by Jeff Bennett) - The scientist responsible for creating Red Tornado and an operative of the Light. He also created Red Torpedo and Red Inferno to infiltrate the Justice Society of America, both of which failed. He worked with Bromwell Stikk to test out the Mister Twister armor. It is later revealed that the real T.O. Morrow was in a coma at an old age and that he built an android in his place until the android duplicate was destroyed by Red Volcano.
 Mister Twister / Bromwell Stikk (voiced by John de Lancie) - A scientist that is the lab partner of T.O. Morrow. He and T.O. Morrow created the Mister Twister armor and used an android double of Bromwell Stikk to operate it.
 Red Inferno (voiced by Vanessa Marshall) - A robot that resembles Red Tornado, but has fire-based abilities. She had originally been the 1940s heroine Firebrand, but was "too heroic" and wound up "killed" in the line of duty, negating her usefulness to Morrow at the time. Morrow exhumed the "corpse" of Inferno and reactivated her and Red Torpedo, ordering them to attack the Team and reprogram Red Tornado to return to him. Tornado convinces them to aid the team against Red Volcano, and both of them are destroyed in the struggle.
 Red Torpedo (voiced by Jeff Bennett) - A robot that resembles Red Tornado, but has water-based abilities. Morrow found him at a nursing home and forced him to return to his laboratory for an attack on the Team. Along with his "sister" Inferno, he is destroyed in the battle against Red Volcano.
 Red Volcano (voiced by Jeff Bennett) - A robot that resembles Red Tornado, but has volcanic-based abilities. He was created by T.O. Morrow to be the sibling of Red Tornado, Red Inferno, and Red Torpedo. Red Volcano destroyed the T.O. Morrow android. In Season 2, Volcano returns searching for the Amazo android, but is finally destroyed by Blue Beetle.
 Daniel Brickwell / Brick (voiced by Khary Payton) - A super-strong criminal from Star City. His gun smuggling operation was thwarted by Red Arrow and sent to Belle Reve. He was part of the failed breakout plan to escape from the prison. In Outsiders, he attempts to rob a shipment protected by Will Harper's Bowhunter Security, and to his amazement he is defeated and arrested by the Harpers and Dick Grayson working as security guards. Brick is later revealed to be part of the Suicide Squad.
 Bane (voiced by Danny Trejo) - A Hispanic supervillain and an enemy of Batman who uses the super-steroid Venom to increase his strength. He was the ruler of the island nation, Santa Prisca in the Caribbean Sea, where he headed a factory that manufactured the Venom. However, the island was taken over by the Cult of the Kobra after Bane was defeated by their super-powered agent, Mammoth. After, the factory was destroyed by the Team, he was able to get back to his island. Bane and his gang later formed an alliance with the Light where he allowed them to use Santa Prisca as their base of operations. In Season 3, it's revealed that he's no longer dependent on Venom as he now sees it as a crutch.
 Kobra (voiced by Arnold Vosloo) - Leader of the Cult of the Kobra and an ally of The Light. He and his cult once developed the Venom/Blockbuster formula ("Kobra Venom") for The Light. In the companion comic "Uncommon Denominators," Kobra attempts to use his brother Jason as a sacrifice to become a half-man, half-cobra god, but he is stopped by the Team. He makes a cameo in a photograph in season 4 where several members of the Outsiders have apprehended him.
 Professor Ivo (voiced by Peter MacNicol) - A mad scientist and associate of the Light. He was the one who created Amazo and helped Brain and Klarion the Witch Boy weaponize the Starro-Tech. Like his longtime rival T.O. Morrow, he has replaced himself with an android double to escape Belle Reve.
 Amazo (voiced by Peter MacNicol) - An android created by Professor Ivo. He has the ability to copy the powers of the Justice League. Superboy defeated it when Artemis' arrow induces Amazo to use Martian Manhunter's density shifting. Before Amazo could fully restore its density, Superboy stuck his fist inside, destroying him.
 M.O.N.Q.I.s (vocal effects provided by Peter MacNicol) - Short for Mobile Optimal Neural Quotient Infiltrators, the M.O.N.Q.I.s are robotic monkeys that serve as the foot soldiers for Professor Ivo. Professor Ivo mentioned that it took him ages to figure out an acronym for "monkey."
 Cheshire / Jade Nguyen (voiced by Kelly Hu) – Member of the League of Shadows, the sister of Artemis, and the daughter of Sportsmaster/Lawrence Crock and the Huntress/Paula Nguyen. Despite the family feud, Cheshire is shown to have a soft spot for Artemis and admits that she doesn't "actually want her dead." In Season 2, Cheshire is shown to be married to Red Arrow with whom they have a child and has left the services of the League of Shadows. She informs Red Arrow on where the real Roy Harper is located, and together they rescue him. Cheshire later teams up with Red Arrow to deactivate one of the Reach bombs in "Endgame". Due to Lian, Jade may retire from the adventurous life she's had. However, as of Season 3, she has continued to operate as an agent for the Light. However, season 4 shows she has since departed the League of Shadows and had been targeted by them. After meeting with Sensei and Talia, Cheshire is lured by Artemis back to her house so they can talk. She later helps with the interrogation of Onyx and Cassandra Savage, and comes to the rescue on Santa Prisca. However, when she considers going back to Will, Lian presenting a homemade version of her mask over the phone scares her into leaving for Infinity Island, where she joins Ra's al Ghul's more peaceful faction of League of Shadows members in the hope of rehabilitating, with Artemis accepting her decision.
 Lian Nguyen-Harper (vocal effects provided by Kelly Hu in season 2, voiced by Zehra Fazal in season 3) - The daughter of Cheshire and Red Arrow; her actual age is not stated, but one or two is likely. Cheshire has said Lian's enjoyment of watching super violence is genetic from her side, prompting Red Arrow to sarcastically retort "great". Lian is shown to be smart for a toddler, saying "Two dadas" when the original Roy Harper is rescued by her parents. She also makes a homemade mask based on her mother's mask, which scares Cheshire off as she doesn't want to be a bad influence for her daughter. Designation: A28.
 League of Shadows – A group of assassins that are led by Ra's al Ghul and carry out the bidding of the Light. As of Season 3 however, a majority of the League now serve Deathstroke after he became their new leader.
 Black Spider / Eric Needham (voiced by Josh Keaton) – A spider-themed assassin and member of the League of Shadows. In the companion comic "Hack and You Shall Find," Black Spider and Hook carry out a hit on a CEO named Selena Gonzalez and encounter Kid Flash, Robin, and Aqualad on the way. He first appears in the show attempting to assassinate Dr. Serling Roquette, but is apprehended by Miss Martian and Kid Flash. He later carries out a hit on Bernell Jones, but is stopped by Green Arrow and Artemis. In Outsiders, Black Spider cooperates with Terra to assassinate Jaqqar Marlo.
 Hook – An assassin with a hook for a hand. In the companion comic "Hack and You Shall Find," Black Spider and Hook carry out a hit on a CEO named Selena Gonzalez and encounter Kid Flash, Robin, and Aqualad on the way. He first appears in the show attempting to assassinate Dr. Serling Roquette, but is apprehended by Miss Martian and Kid Flash.
 Professor Ojo (voiced by Nolan North) – A scientist who wears a special helmet to see and shoot laser beams. In Season One, he deploys the Fog against Wayne Enterprises but is defeated by Robin and Superboy.
 Rictus (voiced by Gwendoline Yeo) - A cyberneticically enhanced assassin. The original comics character was a male assassin who appeared in Red Hood and the Outlaws, but was changed to female in the show.
 Abra Kadabra (voiced by Jeff Bennett) - He is a faux magician who once fought against Flash. He later teamed up with Klarion the Witch Boy to find the Helmet of Fate so the latter can make him a true magician. Abra Kadabra followed Kent Nelson to Madame Xanadu's parlor and kidnapped him. He was defeated by the Team in the Tower of Fate.
 Clayface / Matt Hagen / Harlan Matthews (voiced by Nolan North) - A shapeshifting supervillain made of clay. In the tie-in comics, Matt Hagan was a member of the League of Shadows who gained his powers when Talia al Ghul trapped him in the Lazarus Pit. His appearance is quite ominous, sinister and frightening, looking more like a rotting lump of flesh than a being made of clay. Clayface caused problems for the Team before being tasered by Batman. In Outsiders, Clayface is shown to be under the control of Mad Hatter before being freed by Batman's team. The audio play "The Prize" reveals that Clayface, under the name "Harlan Matthews", reformed and was recruited to join Bowhunter Security. Season 4 continues his redemption by showing him to be a possible reserve member of the Justice League.
 Icicle Sr. / Joar Mahkent (voiced by James Remar) - A criminal who uses cryokinetic technology and the father of Icicle Jr. While imprisoned in Belle Reve, Icicle Sr. initiated a mass breakout attempt with smuggled technology with the help of Captain Cold, Icicle Jr., Killer Frost and Mr. Freeze. Despite not escaping, he and Hugo Strange were satisfied with accomplishing multiple objectives in part for the Light.
 Hugo Strange (voiced by Adrian Pasdar) – A prison psychiatrist of the supervillain prison Belle Reve who is also an operative of the Light. Following Icicle Sr.'s failed breakout plot, Hugo Strange became the new prison warden and was revealed to be Icicle Sr.'s silent partner in the plot to further the goals of the Light. He is responsible for Professor Ivo's temporary breakout on behalf of the Light so that Professor Ivo can weaponize the Light's Starro-Tech.
 Riddler / Edward Nygma (voiced by Dave Franco) - An enemy of Batman who specializes in riddles. He was an inmate at Belle Reve and the only one to escape during Icicle Sr.'s failed breakout attempt. Riddler is also shown to be an agent of the Light as he was seen helping Sportsmaster secure a part of Starro from S.T.A.R. Labs. During the Season 1 finale, he sets up an ambush, asking a riddle about a plant that is not a flower or a tree with "ambush" being the answer. After being captured, Zatanna gags him out of annoyance because he kept trying to say riddles.
 The Injustice League – A small group of villains who used plant-like creatures to attack the Earth in "Revelation." They seemed to be the masterminds behind Season 1's events, but in reality they were scapegoats to distract the Justice League from uncovering the true masterminds: the Light. Besides Count Vertigo and Ultra-Humanite, the following members are: 
 Atomic Skull / Albert Michaels – A S.T.A.R. Labs scientist turned supervillain and enemy of Superman.
 Black Adam – An adversary of Captain Marvel.
 Joker (voiced by Brent Spiner) – Batman's archenemy. Unlike other versions, this one hints towards having multiple personalities. He shows knowledge of the fourth wall....most likely his insanity letting him see the truth of his reality. He is later revealed to be the one Injustice League member who wasn't told the group was being used and showed his resentment towards Vandal Savage by attacking the United Nations in a flashback, prompting Shiva to send Orphan after him.
 Poison Ivy / Pamela Isley (voiced by Alyssa Milano) – An eco-terrorist and plant manipulator who is an enemy of Batman.
 Wotan (voiced by Bruce Greenwood) – An immortal viking sorcerer and an adversary of Doctor Fate. He was one of the magicians summoned by Klarion the Witch Boy to perform a spell that could split the world in two dimensions.
 Intergang - A crime syndicate that uses technology from Apokolips.
 Bruno "Ugly" Mannheim (voiced by Kevin Michael Richardson) - Leader of Intergang. He is later lobotomized by Sportsmaster and Black Beetle to serve as a warning to anyone who goes against the Light. As of Outsiders, he appears to have recovered as he attempted to steal Reach technology.
 Whisper A'Daire (voiced by Grey DeLisle) - Member of Intergang. She is later lobotomized by Sportsmaster and Black Beetle to serve as a warning to anyone who goes against the Light. As of Outsiders, she appears to have recovered as she attempted to steal Reach technology.
 Cairo DeFrey - Member of Intergang.
 Scorpia A'Daire - Member of Intergang.
 Harm / Billy Hayes (voiced by Benjamin Diskin) - He is a sociopathic villain who killed his younger sister Greta to become Harm, a killer seeking the thrill of the hunt. She was the only thing Harm loved, but to wield the Sword of Beowulf, he had to cut her out of his heart by killing her as it requires someone who's pure of heart. He also refers to himself in third-person and uses the impersonal pronoun to refer to others, objectifying them. The guilt of killing Greta eventually overcomes him when her ghost appears, causing the sword to reject him. Whether this left Harm completely mentally broken from guilt is left unknown.
 Felix Faust / Dekan Drache (voiced by Dee Bradley Baker) - A powerful sorcerer and an alchemist who was summoned by Klarion the Witch Boy along with other magicians to perform a spell that could split the world in two dimensions.
 Blackbriar Thorn (voiced by Kevin Michael Richardson) - A High Priest of the ancient Druids of Cymru who is recruited by Klarion the Witch Boy alongside other magicians to cast a powerful spell that would separate the adults and children of Earth onto two separate worlds.
 Wizard / William A. Zard (voiced by Corey Burton) - A skilled magician dressed in Victorian fashion. He was one of the magicians called by Klarion the Witch Boy to cast a spell that split the world into two separate dimensions. Despite being a villain, he later helps with destroying one of Child's fire pillars.
 Parasite / Raymond Jensen (voiced by Adam Baldwin) - A supervillain who can temporary borrow the abilities of anyone by simply touching them. He was approached by Intergang to steal components for a black hole device. To gain access to the European cities from which he had to steal the parts, Parasite joined Haly's Circus as "Ray the Roustabout." He was defeated by the Team, who also infiltrated the circus to stop him, and arrested by King Faraday's group.
 Kroloteans – An alien race that are recurring enemies in Season Two. One Krolotean used a special suit to masquerade as U.N. Secretary-General Tseng only to be exposed and taken away by Lobo. Another one tried to masquerade as Bibbo Bibbowski only to be stopped by Blue Beetle, Bumblebee, and the real Bibbo. There were also some Kroloteans positioned on Malina Island until a bomb planted by Aqualad blew up Malina Island.
 Neutron / Nathaniel Tryon (voiced by James Arnold Taylor) - Neutron was a nuclear-powered supervillain who was created after being experimented on by the Reach. He is cured thanks to Impulse and his future self-creating an antidote for his condition as well as prevent a Reach Apocalypse. Though he was cured, his future self was left horrified that the latter event still came to pass.
 The Reach - An imperial race of aliens that are also known as "the Partner" to the Light and "the Competitor" to the Kroloteans. They have sinister plans for Earth and are abducting teens with latent metagenes to study their powers so they can more effectively fight the planet's superheroes. Following their encounter with The Team, the Reach went to the United Nations and claimed that they are here to assist humanity. In Impulse's future, the Reach (with the help of Jaime Reyes under the Reach's control) have enslaved the human race in what is called "the Reach Apocalypse." They are eventually defeated in the Season 2 finale.
 Reach Ambassador (voiced by Phil LaMarr) - The ambassador of the Reach. He is a skilled actor, but he's also overconfident in his plans; believing them to be infallible. This ultimately led to Black Beetle abandoning him during the three-way battle with the Light and the Team, in favor of saving the Reach Scientist.
 Reach Scientist (voiced by Masasa Moyo) - The head scientist of the Reach. She experimented on young metahumans that were brought to them. Unlike the Ambassador, she is level-headed and sees when things aren't and won't go in their favor. She only grew aggravated while pointing out the Ambassador should have listened to her. Though she was rescued by Black Beetle, she was eventually defeated by the Team.
 Black Beetle (voiced by Kevin Grevioux) - A powerful Reach warrior. He is based on the comics Reach operative Dawur, with the Black Beetle name having originally been used by a human. Black Beetle was first seen in silhouette. When the Team first confronted the Reach, he wasn't referred to by name (simply called "Warrior" by the Ambassador) and was nicknamed "Black Beetle" by Wonder Girl. His scarab was destroyed by Blue Beetle during the final battle against the Reach.
 Despero - An intergalactic gladiator with telepathic powers.
 L-Ron (voiced by Phil LaMarr) - Despero's robotic majordomo.
 Mongul (voiced by Keith David) - The ruler of Warworld. He came to Earth on Vandal Savage's advice to further the Reach's plans. After being confronted by the Team and the runaways, he was trapped in one of the artificial planet's stasis pods while the Warworld itself eventually fell into the Light's possession.
 Toyman / Winslow Schott (voiced by Cameron Bowen) - A criminal that uses toy-based devices in his crimes.
 Baron Bedlam / Frederick DeLamb (voiced by Nolan North) - The commander-in-chief of Markovia's security forces. He is the brother of Queen Ilona DeLamb-Markov and brother-in-law of King Viktor Markov of Markovia. He ran a meta-human trafficking ring under the name Baron Bedlam.
 Dr. Simon Ecks (voiced by Troy Baker) - A metahuman geneticist working under DeLamb and alongside Count Vertigo with the ability to make clones of himself
 Jaculi - A Quraci member of Onslaught with super-speed who assassinated the King and Queen of Markovia.
 Plasma / Ana Von Furth (voiced by Grey Griffin) - A fourteen-year-old girl who was transformed into a lava-like monster after being experimented on by Dr. Ecks against her will. She was accidentally killed by Black Lightning when her heart gave out during a fight with the Justice League.
 Plasmus / Otto Von Furth (voiced by Yuri Lowenthal) - Ana's brother who was similarly transformed into a lava-like monster and placed under Count Vertigo's control against his will. He was killed by a civilian who witnessed a fight between him and the Outsiders after Black Lightning fried his control chip.
 Ma'alefa'ak / M'comm M'orzz (voiced by Ben Diskin) - A villainous White Martian and the younger brother of Miss Martian. He calls himself "Ma'alefa'ak" in reference to a feared four-legged, three-eyed Martian creature. Ma'alefa'ak posed as Orion to attack the Bugs of New Genesis until he was exposed by his sister. He returns in season 4, continuing to cause further racial tensions on Mars, and is later rewarded with a bomb by DeSaad capable of eradicating other Martians. The bomb is later discovered after Lor-Zod interacts with it to draw Conner's attention and laces the bomb with kryptonite after he destroyed it. In the aftermath of Superboy's "death", M'gann confronts her brother where she learns that he knew nothing of the kryptonite and escapes through a boom tube. He is later shown now fully working for Darkseid, staging talks of revolutions to bait potential rebels into stepping forth to be lured and captured, and is assigned to work for Lor-Zod by Grayven. Helping him capture the Legion, he uses a Legion ring and disguises as Chameleon Boy, Saturn Girl, and Bart to trick Phantom Girl into telling him to go to Trombus, and eventually disrupts Danny Chase's mind in the Kaiser-Thrall. He joins the Zods in trying to conquer Earth, but is overpowered by Danny and banished to the Phantom Zone. After the Kryptonians are imprisoned on the Warworld, Ma'alefa'ak is returned to Darkseid. He is rewarded by Grayven with the planet of Durla, the future homeworld of Chameleon Boy, to settle the White Martians on.
 K'omm B'lanxx (voiced by Troy Baker) - A White Martian who is allied with Ma'alefa'ak.
 Mad Hatter / Jervis Tetch (voiced by Dwight Schultz) - A scientist who specializes in mind control devices and an enemy of Batman. He worked with Cheshire to implant his mind control tech into Shade, and is also shown to have taken control of Clayface.
 Shade / Richard Swift (voiced by Joel Swetow) - A supervillain who can manipulate shadows. He is used in a plot by the Light involving Jervis Tetch's mind control technology. In Season 4, he has joined forces with the League of Shadows (much to Cheshire's shock). He later betrays them as a favor to Cheshire by teleporting Artemis, Cheshire, Onyx, and Orphan to another part of Santa Prisca and quits the League of Shadows afterwards to go freelance.
 Doctor Moon (voiced by Vic Chao) - An underworld physician who treats supervillains.
 Child (voiced by Erika Ishii) - A Lord of Chaos who comes down to Earth and takes the form of a young child, deriving her name from a remark made by a security guard. She came because Klarion had not been properly doing enough chaos on Earth, and hopes to take his place, forcing other magical heroes to have to save him from her.
 Flaw - Child's familiar who was formed from a gemstone from Atlantis kept safe in a museum.
 Lor-Zod (voiced by Phil Morris) - The true identity of the time traveler who attempted to kill Superboy by interfering with Ma'alefa'ak's gene bomb and the son of General Zod. The primary antagonist of season 4, he was born in the Legion of Super-Heroes' future, and sought revenge against them for re-imprisoning his parents to the Phantom Zone. He targeted their inspiration, Superboy, so the Legion would never be formed and therefore with no one to battle his father, General Zod would rule the galaxy. Following his apparent success at assassinating Superboy, Lor-Zod decided to free his parents and followers early in the past and began his search for the Phantom Zone projector, discovering it was in Metron's vault. He allied with Darkseid, who instructed Ma'alefa'ak and Mantis to assist Lor in his mission and though he acquires the projector, it's destroyed by the Legion and Bart Allen before he could use it free his father. Lor-Zod and Ma'alefa'ak board the Bio-Ship and capture Bart, Chameleon Boy, and Saturn Girl and head to Oa to regain the Kaiser-Thrall, a piece of technology used by them during their mission only to learn it was sent to Earth. In his efforts to learn Phantom Girl's location, he discovers Superboy is still alive and travels to Trombus to interfere with the heroes mission to free him from the Phantom Zone and greets his parents. He joins his parents' goals to conquer Earth, but is foiled by the Team and forced to flee in the now repaired Time Sphere after his father and the other inmates, except Ursa, are banished back to the Phantom Zone. However, Lor is unable to control the Time-Sphere, unaware Metron pre-set the controls to get Rocket to Earth with full knowledge Lor would take the Time Sphere, and also pre-set the coordinates so Lor would wind up back on Mars when Superboy was destroying the gene bomb. The Time Sphere abandons Lor to be caught in the explosion from the bomb, which disintegrates him and reveals him to be the true owner of an ash silhouette that the other heroes mistook as belonging to Superboy. As his mother Ursa is still pregnant, she will likely give birth to a new Lor-Zod eventually.

Supporting characters

Introduced in Season One
 Dubbilex (voiced by Phil LaMarr) - A genomorph bred to possess telekinesis but also has telepathic powers that were kept secret from Cadmus officials. Dubbilex felt that Superboy could lead the genomorphs to their freedom. After Blockbuster's defeat, Dubbilex continued working under Guardian; the treatment of the genomorphs was better (since they were given names and treated equally), but they still could not leave Cadmus. However, he continued his plans to obtain freedom by secreting them away to a secret city deep under Cadmus called Genomorph City. The Light discovered it and raided the Cadmus facility. In Outsiders, Dubbilex is shown to have founded an above-ground city called Geranium City, where the genomorphs can live in secrecy thanks to his telepathy; with him appearing under the alias of "Mayor Donovan". Dubbilex pushes Superboy to reveal his nature as a genomorph, which he does in the finale. He is revealed in season 4 to be a possible reserve member of the Justice League. Designation: E18
 Guardian II / Jim Harper (voiced by Crispin Freeman) - A superhero who worked as the head of security at Project Cadmus. He is the genomorph clone of Roy Harper, accelerated a couple extra years in age and brainwashed to believe he is Roy Harper's uncle. His identity is based on a long deceased previous Guardian. After Superboy was freed, Dubbilex lifted the telepathic control on Guardian. When the head-scientist Mark Desmond was defeated, Guardian was appointed as the new head of Cadmus by the Light. Guardian was under a mind spell when the Light raided the Cadmus building. Five years later, Jim had abandoned the Guardian alias and took part in Green Arrow's intervention on Roy Harper's clone. Jim even mentioned that he doesn't know who Jim Harper was. In Outsiders, he helps Nightwing with a mission, and his brother Will with a job for his company. He is later shown in season 4 to be a possible reserve member of the Justice League. Designation: G05, later A45 and E06.
 Amanda Spence (voiced by Vanessa Marshall) - A scientist employed by Project Cadmus. She was an assistant to Mark Desmond in his genomorph research. After Superboy was freed and Desmond defeated, Guardian was put in charge of Cadmus and Spence was made acting chief scientist. She and Guardian were later confronted by Superboy, who accused them of making another super-clone. Though they denied that Project Match wasn't theirs. Amanda was knocked unconscious when the Light raided the Cadmus building.
 Serling Roquette (voiced by Tara Strong) - A brilliant young scientist working at Royal University in Star City and creator of the "Fog," a dangerous nanotechnology weapon which could destroy anything in its path. The League of Shadows captured her to make the Fog for them. Though Red Arrow rescued her, the Fog was already in use by the League of Shadows. She then helped the Team to create a virus that could stop the Fog. Later, Serling also helped create the Cure-Tech that could negate the effects of Starro-Tech used on the Justice League.
 Madame Xanadu (voiced by Cree Summer) - A former con artist turned seer in New Orleans following her experience with Kent Nelson and Abra Kadabra. She is later shown to be a possible reserve member of the Justice League.
 Kent Nelson (voiced by Ed Asner) - A retired superhero who by using the Helmet of Fate, could allow his body to be used by the Lord of Order known as Nabu, thus becoming Doctor Fate. In this guise, he was also a member of the Justice Society of America. He retired after his late wife Inza convinced him that there was more to life than being a hero. Kent continued protecting the Helmet in the Tower of Fate in Salem. During Wally's fight with Klarion, Kent died and his spirit went into the Helm of Fate. After Wally as Doctor Fate defeated Klarion, Nabu declared that he would keep Wally's body permanently. Kent's spirit convinced Nabu that Wally was not a suitable host, and offered to stay with Nabu until a replacement could be found, foregoing his chance to ascend and be reunited with Inza. This lasted until Nabu forcibly passed Kent into the next life before possessing Zatara.
 Alfred Pennyworth (voiced by Jeff Bennett) - Bruce Wayne's loyal butler who assists his employer in his duties both as Bruce Wayne and as the Batman.
 Mary West and Rudy West (voiced by Cree Summer and Steve Blum) - Wally West's parents who are supportive of their son's dual life as a super-hero. Rudy West is also the brother of Iris West Allen.
 Iris West (voiced by Nicole Dubuc) - Wife of Flash, sister of Rudy West, and aunt of Wally West. She is also the paternal grandmother of Bart Allen in the future. Iris is aware of her husband's superhero activities. She works as a reporter for GBS and even congratulated her nephew on his birthday live on-screen. She later discovers from Bart that she's pregnant with his father and aunt, twins Don and Dawn Allen.
 Joan Garrick (voiced by Kath Soucie) - She is the wife of Jay Garrick and close friends with the West and Allen families. She and Jay also attended Kent Nelson's funeral. In season 3, she fell sick and later passed away.
 Cat Grant (voiced by Masasa Moyo) – A female reporter who frequently reports on the various matters concerning the Justice League and their enemies.
 Queen Mera (voiced by Kath Soucie) - Wife of Aquaman and Queen of Atlantis. She is also the headmistress of the Conservatory of Sorcery where she trained Aqualad, Tempest, Aquagirl, and Lagoon Boy. Queen Mera helped create Cure-Tech that could negate the effects of Starro-Tech (which brought the entire Justice League under the control of the Light). In season 4, she fulfills a prophecy to become the high king of all the underwater kingdoms, allowing Orin to become Aquaman again, and now wears Arion's crown. She is also shown to be a possible reserve member of the Justice League.
 Lori Lemaris (voiced by Kath Soucie) - A mermaid who is one of the students attending the Atlantean Conservatory of Sorcery.
 Nuidis Vulko (voiced by Jeff Bennett) - The chief scientific advisor of Atlantis and head of the Atlantean Science Center, where he also examined Starro. Later, he helped Mera create the Cure-Tech that would counter the Starro-Tech.
 Topo (voiced by James Arnold Taylor) - An octopus-like inhabitant of Atlantis.
 Paula Nguyen (voiced by Kelly Hu) - She was the ex-villain Huntress and the ex-wife of Sportsmaster. Paula is also the mother of Cheshire and Artemis. She left her life of crime after her imprisonment ended. At some point in her life, Paula ended up in a wheelchair. Since her reform, Paula wanted Artemis to be a vigilante rather than a criminal.
 Uncle Dudley (voiced by Corey Burton) - Billy Batson's uncle. Dudley lives in an apartment in Fawcett City and appears in the episodes "Alpha Male" and "Misplaced".
 Wolf (vocal effects provided by Dee Bradley Baker) – A genetically altered albino Indian wolf that Superboy adopted following the Team's fight with Brain in India. He does active missions with the Team throughout seasons 1 and 2, but eventually retires to Superboy's and Miss Martian's residence in Happy Harbor, often seen sleeping. Designation: C02
 Sphere – A machine from New Genesis picked up from one of the Team's missions to Bialya after it was transferred there by the Light's as-yet-unidentified intergalactic partner. Ever since it was rescued from the Bialyans, Sphere became a loyal companion to Superboy. She can transform into assorted machinery, including a motorcycle-like vehicle which Wally has dubbed "the Super Cycle". Designation: C01
 Marvin White (voiced by Nolan North) - A student at Happy Harbor High School who is friends with Wendy Harris, Conner Kent, Megan Morse, Karen Beecher, and Mal Duncan. In the second season, he began a romantic relationship with Wendy.
 Wendy Harris (voiced by Masasa Moyo) - A student at Happy Harbor High School who is friends with Marvin White, Karen Beecher, Megan Morse, Conner Kent, and Mal Duncan. In the second season, she and Conner began to grow closer as friends and towards the end of the season, it's hinted she and Conner may have started dating; upsetting M'gann as she wished to renew her and Conner's relationship. However, it's later revealed she began dating Marvin White and was getting help from Conner, being the medium to their new relationship; relieving M'gann.
 Snapper Carr (voiced by Greg Weisman) - A teacher at Happy Harbor High School and a former associate of the Justice League when he was a teenager. Five years later, he is shown helping out in "The Team's" cave; he appears to be Beast Boy's tutor. Two years after that, he helped house Geo-Force and Halo of the Outsiders. He is later shown to have married a police officer named Bethany Lee and adopted Harper and Cullen Row between seasons 3 and 4.
 Amanda Waller (voiced by Sheryl Lee Ralph) - A tough prison warden of Belle Reve. When Icicle Sr. lead a prison breakout, she and the prison's psychiatrist Hugo Strange are put in a cell. After the breakout is foiled, she is replaced by Strange as the warden. In season 3, Amanda Waller establishes the Suicide Squad to operate outside of Belle Reve and finds out about the Team. Waller now uses this knowledge against them to keep her Suicide Squad secret.
 Bette Kane (voiced by Alyson Stoner) - A friend of Dick Grayson, Barbara Gordon, and Artemis who was a student at Gotham Academy.
 Marie Logan (voiced by Danica McKellar) - She was the mother of Garfield Logan and a wildlife preservationist who ran the Logan Reserve around the borders of Bialya and Qurac. She once starred in a television show called "Hello Megan!" that inspired Miss Martian's human guise and her catchphrase. Later on however, Marie is killed in a car accident caused by Queen Bee with the events traumatizing Garfield.
 General Wade Eiling (voiced by Jeff Bennett) - A 4-Star General.
 Jason Bard (voiced by Jeff Bennett) - A US Marine under General Eiling. In Season 4, he left the military, became a private eye, and is now Artemis' current boyfriend. A holographic version of him as a soldier previously appeared as part of a mental simulation the Team was undertaking.
 Secret / Greta Hayes (voiced by Masasa Moyo) - Greta Hayes was Harm's younger sister. She was the only thing he loved, but since he required his heart to be pure to hold the Sword of Beowulf, he had to cut her out of his heart by killing her. Somehow upon her death, she became a ghost until her brother was defeated enough to avenge her and put her to rest. Artemis speculated that the last thing Greta saw was the broken neon sign of Abel's House of Secrets across the street (specifically the word "secret").
 James Gordon (voiced by Corey Burton) - The police commissioner of the Gotham City Police Department, the father of Barbara Gordon, and an ally of Batman.
 Queen Perdita Vladek (voiced by Ariel Winter in season 1, Hynden Walch in season-3-Present) - A young member of the royal family and crowned Queen of Vlatava. Perdita was taken ill and hospitalized at Seattle Medical Center and required a heart transplant from a donor at Boston General Hospital. Her uncle Count Vertigo arranged for five flying ice fortresses to blanket the whole of North America in snow, in exchange for Vlatava's allegiance to the Light. Kid Flash was given the task of carrying the heart across the country. Vertigo hoped that Perdita would die and he would be made King of Vlatava. However, his plans were foiled by Kid Flash and Perdita was saved. In Season 3, it's revealed that she entered a relationship with Beast Boy after attending Kid Flash's funeral. In Season 4, Beast Boy's depression causes them to break up, and during the later marriage preparations for Superboy and Miss Martian, she approaches him and says she has moved on from their relationship, so he must as well. The Targets comic, set after season 4, shows her being captured, and the various heroes working to save her. It also reveals she became the queen because her father King Josef had been assassinated by the League of Shadows. Infinity Inc. seemingly rescues her, but Geo-Force is unaware that Everyman is pretending to be her. Later investigation reveals that Perdita was targeted because she was attempting to give kryptonite to the Justice League covertly. When the Team later finds her, it is revealed Psimon set up a mental trap in her mind in case Miss Martian tried to help her. After the Team and Outsiders overcome the manipulations of Queen Bee, Onslaught, and Vertigo, dropping the mental traps, she is rescued, but while still not able to become Beast Boy's girlfriend again, she agrees to be family, which the Justice League uses to prevent further attacks by the Light. Perdita was originally created by showrunner and co-creator Greg Weisman for DC Showcase: Green Arrow, with Ariel Winter reprising the role from it, albeit with her hair changed from red to blonde and her title from Princess to Queen.
 Rumaan Harjavti (voiced by Bruce Greenwood) - The elected president of Qurac. Queen Bee of the neighboring Bialya used Psimon to control him; forcing him to step down and invite Bialyan military into the country to enforce martial law. The plan was foiled after Psimon was defeated by Miss Martian. Five years later, Rumaan was mentioned to have been assassinated and replaced by his brother Sumaan.
 Noor Harjavti (voiced by Vanessa Marshall) - She is the daughter of Rumaan Harjavti, the late president of Qurac. Noor stood by her father after the Team defeated Psimon, and helped him recover from his psychic enslavement. She is replaced by a body double by the Kroloteans, but is freed by Tim Drake, La'gaan and Blue Beetle
 Jack Haly (voiced by Stephen Root) - The owner and ringmaster of Haly International Traveling Circus, which Dick Grayson used to work for in his youth.
 King Faraday (voiced by Clancy Brown) - An Interpol agent. Faraday was in charge of the investigation of high-end equipment thefts took place all over Europe. After heists in Italy, Madrid and Paris, he made a connection to Haly's Circus. All of the crimes coincided with the traveling circus' schedule. When Parasite was defeated, King Faraday's group arrived where he placed an inhibitor collar on him prior to arresting Parasite.

Introduced in Season Two
 Lobo (voiced by David Sobolov) - An intergalactic bounty hunter. He first appeared on Earth where he attacked the United Nations to capture Secretary-General Tseng, only for him to fight Batgirl and Wonder Girl. During the fight, it is discovered that Tseng is secretly a Krolotean in disguise after ripping his disguise in half. Lobo then leaves with the Krolotean to give it to the people who hired him to capture the Krolotean. He returned to Earth in season 3 after being secretly hired by the Light to kill Forager and confirm their suspicions regarding Nightwing assembling a new covert team, his attack failing due to Forager tricking him into success by shedding his skin. He later returns at the end of season 3 to kill a renegerated copy that formed from a finger he lost during his earlier battle.
 G. Gordon Godfrey (voiced by Tim Curry in season two, James Arnold Taylor in season three) - A political commentator on GBS who heavily promotes a xenophobic anti-alien agenda blaming the Justice League for helping further the goals of the Krolotean invaders. At the end of the second season, G. Gordon Godfrey was seen with DeSaad when Vandal Savage met with Darkseid. This leads some to wonder what his goal is or if he is simply a puppet being used by Darkseid in exchange for something. In season 3, G. Gordon Godfrey interviewed Gretchen Goode about the Goode Goggles.
 Catherine Cobert (voiced by Stephanie Lemelin) – The public relations liaison for the Justice League.
 Adam Strange (voiced by Michael Trucco) - A young S.T.A.R. Labs scientist who ended up on Rann following a Zeta Ray experiment and befriended Sardath and his daughter Alanna. He helped Superboy, Miss Martian, and Beast Boy fight the Kroloteans on Rann. He is still learning the Rannian language, but often has to resort to charades to continue a conversation; Miss Martian's telepathic powers help overcome this by allowing him to hear English from Sardath and Alanna, while they hear Rannian. He is later considered a possible reserve member of the Justice League in season 4.
 Sardath (voiced by W. Morgan Sheppard) - A Rannian scientist. Sardath was investigating the Kroloteans' theft of his Zeta Ray technology, and accidentally transported Adam to Rann. The two scientists became good friends, despite the language barrier normally present.
 Alanna (voiced by Jacqueline Obradors) - Sardath's daughter and later Adam Strange's girlfriend. She is considered a possible reserve member of the Justice League in season 4.
 Blue Beetle II / Ted Kord - The second Blue Beetle after Dan Garrett but before Jaime Reyes. Unlike his mentor, he did not bond with the scarab. Instead he developed his own weapons to fight crime. Additionally, he was a member of the Justice League during the event between seasons one and two. He died trying to stop Sportsmaster and Deathstroke from claiming the scarab for the Light which quickly ended up in Reyes' possession. For his sacrifice, he was given a holographic memorial in Mount Justice. Designation: 22
 Tye Longshadow (voiced by Gregg Rainwater) - A friend of Jaime Reyes who ran away after getting tired of being abused by his mother's boyfriend Maurice Bodaway. Tye was captured by agents of the Light and handed over to the Reach for experimentation. He was rescued by the Team before he was transferred to S.T.A.R. Labs in Taos, New Mexico. Tye eventually developed the ability to project an "astral" version of himself, which can grow several stories tall. He is later shown in season 4 to be a possible reserve member of the Justice League.
 Carol Ferris (voiced by Kari Wahlgren) - The head of Ferris Aircraft.
 Thomas Kalmaku (voiced by Kevin Michael Richardson) - A technician at Ferris Aircraft.
 Eduardo Dorado, Sr. (voiced by Bruce Greenwood) - A scientist who is the father of Eduardo Dorado, Jr. In Season 3, he helps found the Metahuman Youth Center to help youths who were kidnapped for their metagenes acclimate to their powers, with his son serving as a counselor and "translator".
 Asami "Sam" Koizumi (voiced by Janice Kawaye) - A Japanese runaway until she was captured by agents of the Light and handed over to the Reach for experimentation. She was rescued by the Team before she was transferred to S.T.A.R. Labs in Taos, New Mexico. Asami developed the ability to focus her chi (which covers her in a glowing aura), which she can project it outward to break through solid rock, leap at superhuman levels, and soften landings; leaving a trail of concentric circles. She only speaks a little bit of English and has different colored eyes. She is later shown to be a possible reserve member of the Justice League in season 4.
 Green Beetle / B'arzz O'oomm (voiced by Phil LaMarr) - A Green Martian who became a servant of the Reach after being bonded to a scarab on Mars, similar to Jaime Reyes. He was assigned to gain the Team's trust by helping them defeat Black Beetle so that the Reach could get Blue Beetle's scarab back under their control. Like Blue Beetle, Green Beetle was freed from the Reach's influence by Zatanna using a spell that Doctor Fate prepared her to cast. The Green Beetle scarab was later destroyed by Black Beetle. Following the battle with the Reach, B'arzz O'oomm returns to Mars. He is later shown to be a possible reserve member of the Justice League in season 4, and meets Conner and M'gann during their visit to Mars. His name is a play on the Barsoom franchise by Edgar Rice Burroughs.
 Jonathan Kent (voiced by Mark Rolston) - The adoptive father of Superman and Superboy.
 Martha Kent (voiced by Zehra Fazal) - The adoptive mother of Superman and Superboy.
 Robin II / Jason Todd (voiced by Josh Keaton) - The second person to adopt the Robin identity, after Dick Grayson (who has since become Nightwing). Sometime during the five-year lapse between Season 1 and Season 2, Jason joined the Team. He was killed by the Joker with Tim Drake becoming his successor as Robin. Though he has a holographic memorial in Mount Justice, he doesn't make his first full appearance until Season 3 where it is revealed that (unbeknownst to the Team initially) he is alive, albeit with amnesia and slowly regaining his memory as well as working for Ra's al Ghul as a red-hooded ninja. Designation: B13.
 Blue Beetle I / Dan Garrett - The first Blue Beetle and owner of the scarab after he found it on an archaeological dig, believing it to be a magical artifact. He eventually passed it and the mantle of Blue Beetle onto his protege Ted Kord.

Introduced in Season Three
 King Gregor Markov (voiced by Crispin Freeman) - The Crown Prince of Markovia, older fraternal twin brother of Prince Brion Markov, and older brother to Princess Tara who takes over as the King of Markovia following the death of his parents. When Brion becomes Geo-Force and Baron Bedlam is arrested, Gregor has no choice but to exile his brother to keep Markovia safe. Though he does tell Superboy to take care of him. Gregor is overthrown by Brion at the end of Season Three and is now a king-in-exile.
 King Viktor Markov and Queen Ilona DeLamb-Markov (voiced by Bruce Greenwood and Vanessa Marshall) - The King and Queen of Markovia. After announcing their plans to end metahuman trafficking which took their missing daughter, they are killed by a Quraci metahuman working for Queen Ilona's brother Baron Bedlam.
 Anissa Pierce (voiced by Masasa Moyo) - The daughter of Black Lightning.
 Jennifer Pierce - The daughter of Black Lightning.
 Lynn Stewart-Pierce (voiced by Denise Boutte) - The ex-wife of Black Lightning. This version of the character is the sister of John Stewart.
 Sumaan Harjavti (voiced by Mark Rolston) - The brother of Rumaan Harjavti who succeeded him as the President of Qurac. After Qurac was annexed by Bialya, Sumaan became the ambassador of Greater Bialya at the United Nations.
 Kaizen Gamorra (voiced by Crispin Freeman) - The ambassador of United Rhelasia at the United Nations.
 Wilhelm Vittings (voiced by Josh Keaton) - A Markovian who had shown displeasure with Markovia taking in Quraci refugees. In season four, Wilhelm was believed to be the head of an anti-meta movement. He and his men try to recapture Lizard Johnny only to run into Infinity Inc. While his men were defeated, Wilhelm got away by slipping past Everyman (implied to be due to Everyman impersonating him).
 Silas Stone (voiced by Khary Payton) - A S.T.A.R. Labs scientist conducting research on a Reach device said to be a "metahuman fail-safe" as well as a Father Box that he merged with his son, Victor, to save his life after he was caught in an explosion.
 Simon Stagg - A businessman and CEO of Stagg Enterprises who ran a metahuman trafficking ring before he was foiled by the Justice League. While in prison, he was visited by Shade.
 Lois Lane (voiced by Grey Griffin) - A reporter for the Daily Planet, the wife of Superman, and Jonathan Samuel Kent's mother.
 Jonathan Samuel Kent (voiced by Grey Griffin) - The son of Superman and Lois Lane. In season 4, he is hinted to be developing powers and learns the concept of life and death to understand the passing of Superboy.
 Don and Dawn Allen - The twin offspring of Barry Allen as well as the father and aunt of Bart Allen, respectively.
 Amistad Ervin (voiced by Khary Payton in season 3, Kurtis Mansfield in season 4) - The son of Rocket. In season 4, he is revealed to have autism.
 Traya Smith - The adopted daughter of Red Tornado.
 Cisco Ramon (voiced by Jacob Vargas) - A high school student and classmate of Victor Stone.
 Harper Row (voiced by Zehra Fazal) - A student at Happy Harbor High and a classmate of Violet and Forager's. She is later adopted by Snapper Carr between seasons 3 and 4.
 Cullen Row (voiced by Benjamin Diskin) - The brother of Harper Row. He is later adopted by Snapper Carr between season 3 and 4.
 Doom Patrol - A team of superheroes who adopted Garfield Logan after his mother was killed. It's implied that all except Mento were themselves killed while on a mission which eventually led Gar to join the Team. The first appearance of the Doom Patrol in a hallucination in Beast Boy's mind, chronicling their final moments before their death, is a reference to Teen Titans Go!
 Chief / Dr. Niles Caulder (voiced by Scott Menville) - The paraplegic leader of the Doom Patrol with genius-level intellect.
 Mento / Steve Dayton (voiced by Scott Menville) - A member of the Doom Patrol with psionic abilities and Gar's stepfather. As the only survivor, it's implied that he took custody of Gar and forced him to leave the Team and become a television star to make him rich.
 Elasti-Girl / Rita Farr (voiced by Hynden Walch) - A member of the Doom Patrol with size-changing abilities, Marie's best friend, and Gar's godmother. She adopted him after Marie was killed and helped him join the Doom Patrol.
 Robotman / Clifford "Cliff" Steele (voiced by Khary Payton) - A member of the Doom Patrol whose brain upon his death was placed inside a robotic body that grants him superhuman abilities. He is revealed in season 4 to also have survived the demise of his team when his head is found and put on a new body, and attends Beast Boy's intervention.
 Negative Woman / Valentina Vostok (voiced by Tara Strong) - A member of the Doom Patrol with a radioactive "soul-self".
 Rocket Red Brigade - A group of armored superheroes operating in Russia.
 Rocket Red #1 / Commander Olga Illyich (voiced by Stephanie Lemelin) - Leader of the Rocket Red Brigade.
 Rocket Red #4 / Dmitri Pushkin (voiced by Steve Blum) - Member of the Rocket Red Brigade.
 Suicide Squad - A team of Belle Reve prisoners that work for Amanda Waller in exchange for suspended sentences. Besides Black Manta, Monsieur Mallah, Brick, and Tuppence Terror, the following are members of the Suicide Squad:
 Flagg - Field commander for the Suicide Squad.
 Captain Boomerang / George "Digger" Harkness (voiced by Crispin Freeman) - A boomerang-wielding member of the Suicide Squad and enemy of Flash.
 Angel O'Day (voiced by Danica McKellar) - A woman from Los Angeles. Beast Boy once got a selfie with her.
 Newsgirl Legion - A genderbent version of the Newsboy Legion that resides in Brooklyn, Maine and specialize in social media.
 Tommi Thompkins (voiced by Mae Whitman) - Member of the Newsgirl Legion.
 Gabi Gabrielle (voiced by Grey Griffin) - Member of the Newsgirl Legion.
 Antonia "Big Words" Rodriguez (voiced by Zehra Fazal) - Member of the Newsgirl Legion.
 Thomas Thompkins (voiced by Jason Marsden) - The father of Tommi Thompkins and the Mayor of Brooklyn, Maine.
 Patrick Maguire (voiced by Troy Baker) - The sheriff of Brooklyn, Maine.
 Helena Sandsmark (voiced by Mae Whitman) - Cassie Sandsmark's mother.
 Metron (voiced by Phil LaMarr) - A chronicler associated with the New Gods of New Genesis. His Mobius Chair was used to exorcise the Father Box spirit out of Victor Stone. Before leaving, he cryptically confirms to Black Lightning that Gretchen Goode is a New God. He later manipulates Razer, and he is attacked by Lor-Zod, Ma'alefa'ak, and Mantis during their heist in his vault, before then going to warn Rocket and other heroes about the stolen Phantom Zone projector. Later, he finds Rocket in his dimension and gives her Lor's former Time Sphere to return to Earth, counting on Lor to steal it again because of it being pre-set to go to Mars and get him killed, abandoning him and returning to Metron's vault.
 Delphis (voiced by Tiya Sircar) - An aquatic metahuman who is taken to Atlantis by Aquaman II after her metagene caused her to lose the ability to survive on land. She is later shown to be a possible reserve member of the Justice League in season 4.
 Calvin Durham (voiced by Phil LaMarr) - An inhabitant of Shayeris, Atlantis and the foster father of Aquaman II.
 Sha'lain'a (voiced by Tara Strong) - An inhabitant of Shayeris, Atlantis and the mother of Aquaman II.
 Wynnde (voiced by Robbie Daymond) - Aquaman II's boyfriend who helps him watch over Dolphin and keep her safe while she's acclimating to her powers. He is later shown to be a possible reserve member of the Justice League. Designation: E15.
 Infinity, Inc. - A group of teenage meta-humans hoping to put metahumans in a good light after becoming inspired by the Outsiders. In reality, they were created by Lex Luthor to serve the Light's needs. They later become Markovia's primary group of heroes following Luthor's ousting from the United Nations, answering to Zviad Baazovi and Geo-Force. It is implied that most of the team is aware Zviad is a psychic and manipulates Geo-Force alongside him. In season four, Infinity Inc. rescues Lizard Johnny from anti-meta thugs. In the Targets comic, they become involved in the mission to rescue Perdita and seemingly succeed in doing so (although it's actually a disguised Everyman).
 Trajectory / Eliza Harmon (voiced by Zehra Fazal) - A teenage metahuman speedster who is one of the members who is most directly loyal to Zviad Baazovi, reporting to him once Geo-Force is unavailable.
 Everyman (voiced by Nolan North) - A meta-human with shape-shifting powers who is hinted to be in on Zviad Baazovi's plans. He is implied to shapeshift into the form of Wihlem Vittings during the team's rescue of Lizard Johnny, nearly gets his team caught during the rescue of Perdita by turning into a non-native raccoon, then shapeshifts into her form (while Vertigo's drones play sounds of his beast form to create the illusion he is still around).
 Fury / Rosa (voiced by Quei Tann) - An African-American meta-human inspired by Greek mythology, who is starting to question the motives of her team.
 Kobold - A blue-skinned size-shifter.
 Jet / Celia Windward (voiced by Lauren Tom) - A young electromagnetic metahuman who is a recent cadet, as shown in the Targets miniseries.
 Lizard Johnny (voiced by Yuri Lowenthal) - A lizard-like metahuman. In season four, Lizard Johnny was rescued from Wilhelm Vittings and his anti-meta thugs by Infinity Inc., and has since been confirmed as a cadet in the Targets miniseries.
 Tod Donner (voiced by Troy Baker) - An anchor working for GBS.
 Economos (voiced by Brandon Vitti) - The warden of Belle Reve Penitentiary.

Introduced in Season Four
 Legion of Super-Heroes - A team of superheroes from the future who have traveled back in time to save Superboy's life from an unknown enemy targeting him, later revealed to be Lor-Zod. They secretly followed Superboy, Miss Martian and Beast Boy during their trip to Mars for the wedding. They originally formed to confront General Zod in the future, but Lor-Zod's assassination attempt on Superboy was able to erase their future and replace it with one where General Zod ruled the galaxy, with only Saturn Girl, Phantom Girl, and Chameleon Boy left due to exposure to chroniton radiation, which protects them from timeline changes.
 Saturn Girl / Imra Ardeen (voiced by Kari Wahlgren) - The telepathic member and leader of the team. She is also able to convince the Bio-Ship to help the Legion. She realizes to her shock when the Phantom Zone projector is destroyed that Superboy and Phantom Girl are alive, barely managing to wake Phantom Girl, but is captured when Lor-Zod and Ma'alefa'ak board the Bio-Ship.
 Phantom Girl / Tinya Wazzo (voiced by Kari Wahlgren) - The body-Phasing member of the team. She successfully managed to save Superboy's life on Mars by attempting to transport them both to her home dimension, Bgztl, but was sent to the Phantom Zone instead, leaving her comatose and burning her hand in the process. She eventually awakens from her coma after Saturn Girl reaches out with her telepathy before the Phantom Zone Projector is destroyed. Phantom Girl tries to send her and Superboy back, but due to his lingering Zone Sickness, reduced to his original Cadmus programming and fallen under General Zod's influence, Superboy refuses, forcing her to leave without him and returns to Mars. She tells J'emm, and joins him on the Watchtower with Miss Martian, going with the other heroes to Trombus when her attempt to get Miss Martian into the Phantom Zone fails, while unwittingly communicating with a disguised Ma'alefa'ak and showing him and Lor where to go.
 Chameleon Boy / Reep Daggle (voiced by Dee Bradley Baker) - The Shape-Shifting member of the team. When Lor and Ma'alefa'ak board the Bio-Ship to capture the Legion, he is overpowered and defeated by Ma'alefa'ak.
 Brainiac Five (voiced by Ben Diskin) - An intelligent half-android member who comes to the past to help return the other Legionnaires to their time after General Zod's defeat.
 Martians - The inhabitants of the planet Mars, also known as M'arzz. A majority of the inhabitants agree that Earth can be strong allies with their planet, while others are prejudiced towards Earthlings. There are three ethnicities, denoted by skin colour; Red (B'lahdenn), Green (G'arruun), and White (A'ashenn). There is also Yellow (Y'ellonn), Martians of either colour become this colour to become a priest or a priestess.
 J'arlia J'axx (voiced by Zehra Fazal) - The Queen regent of Mars, a Red Martian. Widow of the former king, S'turnn J'axx.
 J'emm J'axx (voiced by Phil LaMarr) - The Prince of Mars, a Red Martian. An open-minded individual, J'emm believes that the Martian ways should be changed for the better good. He comes to Earth when Phantom Girl tells him about Superboy's survival, and joins the heroes on Trombus in the mission to free him.
 M'aat M'orzz (voiced by Carl Lumbly) - Miss Martian's father, a White Martian. Lumbly was the voice of Martian Manhunter in Justice League and Justice League Unlimited.
 J'ann M'orzz (voiced by Kari Wahlgren) - Miss Martian's mother, a Green Martian.
 M'ree M'orzz / Em'ree J'onzz (voiced by Hynden Walch) - One of Miss Martian's ten sisters, a Green Martian. Her human guise take the appearance of Rita Lee, Rita Farr's character and Marie Logan's best friend, on Hello, Megan!. Em'ree and M'gann have an uneasy and strained relationship due to issues from their childhood since Em'ree failed to protect or support her white martian siblings from racist abuse. Em'ree comes to realize the error of her ways and wishes to reconcile with M'gann. In the aftermath of Superboy's death, Em'ree comforts her sister and decides to leave Mars and travel to Earth to truly be there for M'gann with the hopes of reconciling and building a true sisterly relationship. By the end of the season, she serves at M'gann's maid of honour at her and Conner's wedding and decides to go back to being M'ree again.
 S'yraa S'mitt (voiced by Zehra Fazal) - A Martian sorcerer-priestess, formerly Green Martian, and Prince J'emm's former love interest. Unfortunately it is revealed that she had an unintentional-hand in King S'turnn J'axx's murder, when she lost control of her magic while trying to reason with him, which in turn motivated her to finish her training to become a Yellow Martian, looking for redemption. 
 R'ess E'dda (voiced by Troy Baker) - Consul-General of Mars, a Green Martian who is against the idea of an alliance between Earth and Mars, and thinks things on Mars should stay as they are. This causes him to butt heads with Queen J'arlia, Prince J'emm, and the Martian Manhunter.
 R'ohh K'arr (voiced by Nolan North) - A Green Martian who is a leading M'Honterr on Mars.
 K'arr M'angg (voiced by Dee Bradley Baker) - A White Martian with a scar over his left eye.
 Onyx Adams (voiced by Logan Browning) - A defected member of the League of Shadows who tries to warn Artemis about Cassandra Savage being a fake defector, and is proven correct. The granddaughter of Amazing-Man who had been recruited by Sensei in the past, she later chooses to join Ra's al Ghul's faction of the League of Shadows.
 Phantom Stranger (voiced by D. B. Woodside) - A mysterious mystical being who appeared to Vandal Savage to remind him the deal he made to Klarion millennia ago, and informs Zatanna that Klarion is needing to be saved. He is briefly mentioned as being considered a reserve member of the Justice League.
 Arion (voiced by David Kaye) - The grandson of Vandal Savage, Lord of Order, and progenitor of Homo Magi and later Homo Mermanus. He seems to return in the present as part of a prophecy, but in reality is a clone body containing Ocean Master's mind which is eventually destroyed when wearing the real Arion's crown.
 Etrigan the Demon / Jason Blood (voiced by David Shaughnessy) - Jason Blood is an occultist bonded with the demon Etrigan. In this version, Etrigan doesn't wear boots. Etrigan was summoned by Phantom Stranger to aid Zatanna against the Lords of Chaos Klarion and the Child. Jason Blood is shown to be a possible reserve member of the Justice League, while Superman and Black Lightning discuss Etrigan getting reserve membership as well.
 Lantern Corps - Intergalactic organizations with members chosen by rings wielding the power of the Emotional Electromagnetic Spectrum. In addition to the Green Lantern Corps, there are also lanterns for yellow, red, blue, orange, violet, indigo as well as black, white, ultraviolet, and gold. This version references Green Lantern: The Animated Series and appears to take place after its series finale.
 Green Lantern / Kilowog (voiced by Kevin Michael Richardson) - A veteran Green Lantern and trainer of new Green Lantern recruits. Richardson reprises his role from Green Lantern: The Animated Series.
 Green Lantern / Tomar-Re (voiced by Dee Bradley Baker) - Another veteran Green Lantern. Tomar-Re usually patrols the nearby sector 2813 and is friendly with lanterns from sector 2814, including Abin Sur and Hal Jordan. Unwilling to lose New Genesis to an awakened Promethean statue like he did Krypton, he sacrifices himself to vent its cascade into space and letting Lor-Zod kill him, and his ring goes to the female Forager.
 Razer (voiced by Jason Spisak) - A Blue Lantern and ally of Kilowog. Razer is a former Red Lantern who renounced his ring once he learned to control his anger and focus on hope. When Metron goads him into giving back his blue ring and retaking his red to become a Red Lantern once more, Razer ends up calling the blue ring back to him and now wields both rings at once, before leaving to search for his lost love Aya. Spisak reprises his role from Green Lantern: The Animated Series.
 Green Lantern / Soranik Natu (voiced by Vanessa Marshall) - A Green Lantern who studies the Kaiser-Thrall on Oa alongside the female Forager, discovering it contains an 11 year old Earth boy.
 Green Lantern / Tomar-Tu (voiced by Dee Bradley Baker) - A Green Lantern and son of the late Tomar-Re.
 Danny Chase (voiced by Jason Marsden) - The human mind inside the Kaiser-Thrall, a trafficked metahuman boy from Earth whose brain was extracted by DeSaad, and whom has telepathy and interdimensional travel. Miss Martian communicates with him after arriving at the Watchtower, and he directs her, Superman, Black Lightning, Green Lantern Forager, Orion, J'emm, and Phantom Girl to Trombus. His mind is disrupted when Ma'alefa'ak invades and overpowers him, but he is later helped by the heroes and opens a Boom Tube to banish General Zod, Faora, Non, and Ma'alefa'ak to the Phantom Zone.

Comic tie-in characters
 Selena Gonzalez - The Chief Executive Officer of Farano Enterprises, a company that once did business with Project Cadmus. She was put up for assassination by the League of Shadows.
 Psycho-Pirate - A masked villain.
 Two-Face - A villain who faced off with Batman and Robin at least once.
 Perry White - The editor-in-chief in the Daily Planet newspaper.
 Jimmy Olsen - A photographer for the Daily Planet.
 Tony Zucco - A Gotham City crime boss who was responsible for sabotaging the trapeze set at Haly's Circus which led to the death of Dick's mother, father, aunt, and cousin while his uncle was paralyzed by the fall. Dick's first outing as Robin was when he helped Batman apprehend Tony Zucco.
 Duk Trang - A retired North Vietnamese general.
 Lieutenant Henry Yarrow - A friend of Capt. Nathaniel Adams who served alongside him during the Vietnam War.
 Peggy Eiling - The daughter of Nathaniel Adams.
 Rako - A Cambodian assassin. He wields a special ionized sword that can cut even Superboy's invulnerable skin.
 Captain Randall "Randy" Eiling - A captain in the United States Air Force.
 Alec Rois - A former CIA agent and ally of Wade Eiling.
 Major General Clement Lemar - Captain Adams's superior during the Vietnam war.
 Sergeant Enos Polk - A member of the Military Police during the Vietnam war.
 Lieutenant Kevin Blankly - The prosecutor at Capt. Nathaniel Adams trial.
 Major Shirley Mason - A doctor in the United States military
 Lucius Fox - An employee at Wayne Enterprises and works for Bruce Wayne.
 Blubber - A student at the Conservatory of Sorcery.
 King Nanaue Sha'ark (voiced by James Arnold Taylor) - The ruler of the city state Nanauve and a student at the Conservatory of Sorcery. He later makes a full appearance in season 4, having grown older.
 Ronal - A student at the Conservatory of Sorcery and a purist, or one who believes that half-fish, half-human Atlanteans are impure and should be purged.
 Danuuth - A member of the royal guard but he is also secretly a purist.
 Dr. Jason Burr - The lead astronomer in Gotham City Observatory and the twin brother of Jeffrey Burr.
 Gorilla Grodd - A Kobra Venom-enhanced gorilla.
 Primat - A Kobra Venom-enhanced gorilla of Solovar's troop and Gorilla Grodd's mate.
 Simeon - The son of Gorilla Grodd and Primant
 Solovar - A Kobra Venom-enhanced silverback gorilla.
 Boka - A Kobra Venom-enhanced gorilla and Solovar's mate.
 Collector of Worlds - An alien android who seeks out and preserves a portion of doomed worlds.
 Ali - The bodyguard of the Harjavtis. At least in 2015, he was enthralled by Queen Bee, and acted out her orders.
 Draaga - An alien who once challenged Superman to do battle.
 Kylstar - Also known as "First Leader", an alien commander determined to free his people from slavery.
 Orb-One - The assistant of Kylstar.
 Major Force - A hero and an acquaintance of Captain Atom. They are not on good terms. He was briefly suggested as a Justice League candidate in season 1.
 Maxima - An alien warrior.
 Vartox - An alien warrior.
 Deadshot / Floyd Lawton - A masked marksman who was hired by Queen Bee.
 Sylvester Pemberton - A newsman who operates from helicopter as "Sylvester the Skyman". His role is based on that from DC Showcase: Green Arrow.
 Merlyn / Arthur King - An assassin who uses a bow, hired to kill Perdita. His role in the Targets comic is based on that from DC Showcase: Green Arrow.
 Metallo / Juan Cordero - A metahuman with regenerative healing turned into a cyborg empowered by kryptonite, confronting the Outsiders in Greater Bialya using the kryptonite that Perdita tried to give Green Arrow and Black Canary. He is loyal to Lex Luthor, viewing him as a father figure who he would do anything to avenge, following Superboy's outing of Lex. After weakening Superboy and Match with kryptonite, viewing the former as an ingrate who betrayed his father, Miss Martian defeats him by removing his kryptonite. However, becoming too dependent on the alien rock to the point removing it would kill him after a while, the heroes are forced to give it back to him and return him to Lex, accomplishing the Light's objective of acquiring the kryptonite while thwarting their simultaneous plot to kill Perdita and reinstate Vertigo's political power.
 Lieutenant Marvel / Freddy Freeman - Another recipient of the power of Shazam who joined and left the Team between seasons 1 and 2. Originally planned by Greg Weisman to appear in the original tie-in comics, in a storyline that was scrapped to move the comics closer to season 2, he finally makes his first onscreen appearance in the final issue of the Targets miniseries, making a brief cameo at Wally West's funeral. Designation: B14.

References

Lists of DC Nation television characters
Lists of DC Comics animated television characters
Lists of characters in American television animation
Young Justice (TV series)